= Colin J. Saldanha =

American neuroscientist and neuroendocrinologist

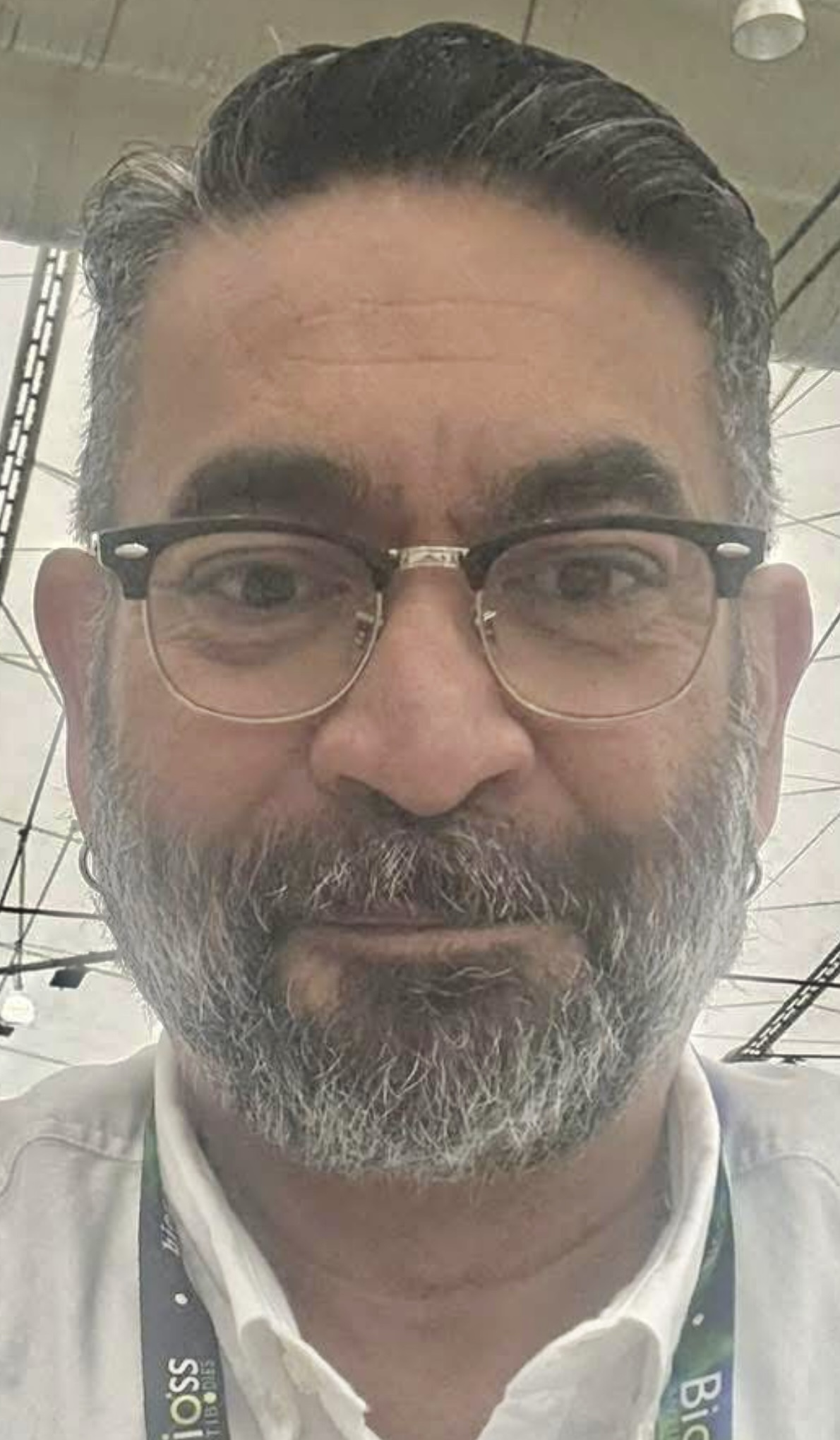
- Born: Colin John Saldanha; November 24, 1966 (age 59); Bombay, India
- Education: Cathedral and John Connon School; Gustavus Adolphus College (Bachelor of Arts); Columbia University(Ph.D)
- Spouse: Cassandra Moore
- Scientific career
- Fields: Neuroendocrinology
- Workplaces: American University; Lehigh University

Colin John Saldanha (born November 24, 1966) is an American neuroscientist, neuroendocrinologist, and professor at American University in Washington, D.C. He is known for his research on neural estrogen synthesis, synaptocrine signaling, and the role of hormones in memory, neuroprotection, and behavior. His work has been supported by the National Institutes of Health (NIH) and the National Science Foundation (NSF).

== Early life and education ==
Saldanha was born to Robert Thomas Colbert Saldanha and Irene Pauline Saldanha. He attended the Cathedral and John Connon School in Bombay and graduated in 1984. He earned a Bachelor of Arts in Biology and Psychology from Gustavus Adolphus College in 1988. He completed his graduate training in Biopsychology at Columbia University, receiving M.A. in 1991, M.Phil. in 1992, and Ph.D. in 1995.

Following his doctorate, Saldanha conducted postdoctoral research in neuroendocrinology at the Brain Research Institute, University of California, Los Angeles (UCLA) from 1996 to 2001.

== Career ==
Saldanha began his independent academic career at Lehigh University, where he joined the Department of Biological Sciences in 2001. He was promoted to associate professor with tenure in 2007 and full professor in 2011.

In 2011, he joined American University, where he is a professor of neuroscience and an affiliate professor of psychology. He has played a role in expanding interdisciplinary neuroscience research at the institution and has served as Chair of the Biology Department. In 2024, he was appointed director of the Center for Neuroscience and Behavior at American University.

From 2018 to 2020, Saldanha served as a program director in the Neural Systems Cluster of the Division of Integrative and Organismal Biology at the National Science Foundation. He later returned as an Expert from 2021 to 2022.

He is involved in the Society for Behavioral Neuroendocrinology, including served as secretary and as chair of the education committee. He was elected President-elect of the society in 2023 and assumed the Presidency in 2025.

He was also a Board Member of the Federation of Associations in Behavioral and Brain Sciences. He also served on the editorial board of Hormones and Behavior.

== Research ==
Saldanha's research examines the neural actions of steroid hormones, with particular emphasis on their spatially and temporally localized effects within the brain. A central theme of his work is the characterization of synaptocrine signaling, a mechanism in which estrogens are synthesized locally at synapses through the enzyme aromatase, enabling rapid modulation of neural activity, synaptic plasticity and behaviour.

His research has also shown that brain injury induces aromatase expression in astroglial cells, resulting in local estrogen production with anti-inflammatory and neuroprotective effects, including sex-specific regulation of cytokine signalling. Using avian model systems, especially songbirds, Saldanha has investigated the role of locally synthesized estrogens in learning, spatial and episodic-like memory, social and reproductive behaviour, and vocal communication. He has authored conceptual and comparative reviews on rapid hormone action and neural aromatization across vertebrate species. His work has been published in peer-reviewed journals including Endocrine Reviews, Endocrinology, Current Biology, Hormones and Behavior, Journal of Neuroendocrinology and Physiology & Behavior.

== Personal life and activism ==
Saldanha has been married to Cassandra Moore since December 1997. He successfully auditioned and sang first tenor (T1) with the Gay Mens Chorus of Los Angeles (GMCLA) from 1997 to 2001, and served as Chair of the Board of Directors from 1999-2001. In 2000 he wrote and was awarded a grant from the California Arts Council to support growth and outreach at GMCLA. He has continued his association with several LGBT+ organizations in Philadelphia and Washington, DC.

== Selected publications ==
=== Journal Articles ===
- Saldanha, Colin J. (2023). "Spatial and temporal specificity of neuroestradiol provision in the songbird". Journal of Neuroendocrinology. 35 (2). doi:10.1111/jne.13192. ISSN 0953-8194. PMC 9889572. PMID 35983989.
- Goyette, Meredith J.; Murray, Sidney L.; Saldanha, Colin J.; Holton, Kathleen (2023). "Sex Hormones, Neurosteroids, and Glutamatergic Neurotransmission: A Review of the Literature". Neuroendocrinology. 113 (9): 905–914. doi:10.1159/000531148. ISSN 0028-3835.
- Schlinger, Barney A.; Remage-Healey, Luke; Saldanha, Colin J. (January 2022). "The form, function, and evolutionary significance of neural aromatization". Frontiers in Neuroendocrinology. 64 100967. doi:10.1016/j.yfrne.2021.100967. ISSN 0091-3022.
- Saldanha, Colin J. (December 2021). "Glial estradiol synthesis after brain injury". Current Opinion in Endocrine and Metabolic Research. 21 100298. doi:10.1016/j.coemr.2021.100298. ISSN 2451-9650. PMC 8903152.
- Saldanha, Colin J. (2020-06-23). "Estrogen as a Neuroprotectant in Both Sexes: Stories From the Bird Brain". Frontiers in Neurology. 11. doi:10.3389/fneur.2020.00497. ISSN 1664-2295. PMC 7324752.
- Saldanha, Colin J.; Duncan, Kelli A.; Walters, Bradley J. (July 2009). "Neuroprotective actions of brain aromatase". Frontiers in Neuroendocrinology. 30 (2): 106–118. doi:10.1016/j.yfrne.2009.04.016. ISSN 0091-3022. PMC 2700852.
- Bailey, David J.; Saldanha, Colin J. (August 2015). "The importance of neural aromatization in the acquisition, recall, and integration of song and spatial memories in passerines". Hormones and Behavior. 74: 116–124. doi:10.1016/j.yhbeh.2015.06.007. ISSN 0018-506X. PMC 9366902.
- Remage-Healey, Luke; Saldanha, Colin J.; Schlinger, Barney A. (2011). "Estradiol Synthesis and Action at the Synapse: Evidence for ?Synaptocrine? Signaling". Frontiers in Endocrinology. 2. doi:10.3389/fendo.2011.00028. ISSN 1664-2392. PMC 3356004.

=== Book chapters ===
- Saldanha, C. J.; Bentley, G.; Cornil, C. A.; de Vries, G. J. (2025). "Sex and gender: Transforming scientific practice". In Zachary DuBois, L.; Trujillo, Anelis Kaiser; . McCarthy, Margaret M (eds.). Strüngmann Forum Reports. Springer-Nature.
- Saldanha, Colin J.; Lehman, Michael N.; Kriegsfeld, Lance J. (2022), "Rae Silver", Biographical History of Behavioral Neuroendocrinology, Cham: Springer International Publishing, pp. 279–289, ISBN 978-3-031-12969-8
- Bailey, David J.; Saldanha, Colin J. (2020-02-24), "Estrogenic Regulation of Spatial Memory in Songbirds", Estrogens and Memory, Oxford University PressNew York, pp. 145–158, ISBN 0-19-064590-3
- Saldanha, Colin J. (2019-05-23), "Brain-Derived Steroids and Behaviors", Oxford Research Encyclopedia of Neuroscience, Oxford University Press, ISBN 978-0-19-026408-6
- Pedersen, Alyssa L.; Saldanha, Colin J. (2017-04-26), "Steroids and Plasticity", Oxford Research Encyclopedia of Neuroscience, Oxford University Press, ISBN 978-0-19-026408-6
- Saldanha, Colin J.; Mehos, Carissa J.; Pedersen, Alyssa L.; Wiggins, William A. (2015), "Astrocytic Aromatization and Injury", Estrogen Effects on Traumatic Brain Injury, Elsevier, pp. 43–49, ISBN 978-0-12-801479-0
- Saldanha, Colin J.; Remage-Healey, Luke; Schlinger, Barney A. (2012-10-19), "Neuroanatomical Distribution of Aromatase in Birds: Cellular and Subcellular Analyses", Brain Aromatase, Estrogens, and Behavior, Oxford University Press, pp. 100–114
- Duncan, Kelli A.; Saldanha, Colin J. (2012-10-19), "Inducible Aromatase in Astroglia: Protection and Recovery from Neural Perturbation in Birds", Brain Aromatase, Estrogens, and Behavior, Oxford University Press, pp. 383–396
