= Baculum =

Bone in the penis

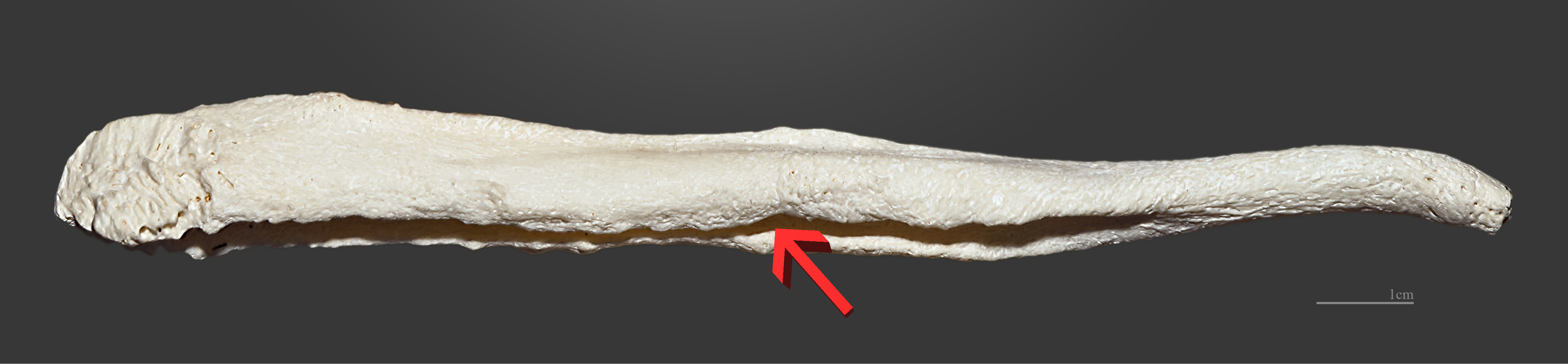
Baculum of a dog's penis; the arrow shows the urethral sulcus, which is the groove in which the urethra lies.

Fossil baculum of a bear (Indarctos) from the Miocene

The baculum (pl.: bacula), also known as the penis bone, penile bone, os penis, os genitale, or os priapi, is a bone in the penis of many placental mammals. It is not present in humans, but is present in the penises of some primates, such as the gorilla and the chimpanzee. The baculum arises from primordial cells in soft tissues of the penis, and its formation is largely influenced by androgens. The bone lies above the urethra, and it aids sexual reproduction by maintaining stiffness during sexual penetration. The homologue to the baculum in female mammals is the baubellum (os clitoridis), a bone in the clitoris.

== Etymology ==
The word baculum means "stick" or "staff" in Latin and originates from Greek: βάκλον, baklon "stick".

== Function ==
The baculum is used for copulation and varies in size and shape by species. Its evolution may be influenced by sexual selection, and its characteristics are sometimes used to differentiate between similar species. A bone in the penis allows a male to mate for a long time with a female, which can be a distinct advantage in some mating strategies. The length of the baculum may be related to the duration of copulation in some species. In carnivorans and primates, the length of the baculum appears to be influenced by postcopulatory sexual selection. In some bat species, the baculum can also protect the urethra from compression.

== Presence in mammals ==
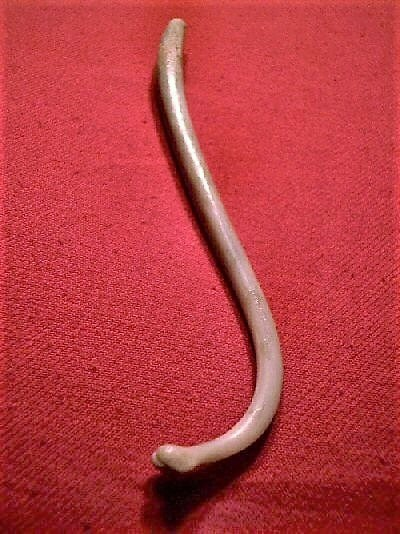
A raccoon baculum

The baculum is absent in monotreme (egg-laying) and marsupial (pouch-bearing) mammals. Mammals having a penile bone include various eutherians (placental mammals):

- Order Primates, although not in humans, lorises, spider monkeys, or woolly monkeys
- Order Rodentia (rodents), though not in the related order Lagomorpha (rabbits, hares, etc.)
- Order Eulipotyphla (insectivores, including shrews and hedgehogs)
- Order Carnivora, including members of many well-known families, such as ursids (bears), canids (dogs), pinnipeds (walruses, seals, sea lions), procyonids (raccoons, etc.), and mustelids (otters, weasels, badgers and others). The baculum is usually longer in the Canoidea than in the Feloidea, although fossas have long bacula and giant pandas have short bacula. However, the baculum is notably absent in carnivorans such as hyenas and binturongs.
- Order Chiroptera (bats)

Within Eutheria, the penile bone is absent in ungulates—hoofed mammals, including cetaceans (whales, dolphins, and porpoises)—elephants, lagomorphs, and sirenians (sea cows), among others.

It is suggested based on evidence that the baculum was independently evolved 9 times and lost in 10 separate lineages. The baculum is an exclusive characteristic of placentals and closely related eutherians, being absent in other mammal clades, and it has been speculated to be derived from the epipubic bones more widely spread across mammals, but notoriously absent in placentals.

Among the primates, marmosets, weighing around 500 grams (18 oz), have a baculum measuring around 2 millimetres (0.079 in), while the tiny 63 g (2.2 oz) galago has one around 13 millimetres (0.51 in) long. The great apes, despite their size, tend to have very small penis bones, and humans are the only ones to have lost them altogether.

In some mammalian species, such as badgers and raccoons (Procyon lotor), the baculum can be used to determine relative age. If a raccoon's baculum tip is made up of uncalcified cartilage, has a porous base, is less than 1.2 g (0.042 oz) in mass, and measures less than 90 mm (3.5 in) long, then the baculum belongs to a juvenile.

== Absence in humans ==
Unlike most primates, humans lack a baculum. Among other great apes, the bone is present, but very reduced. In many ape species, it is a relatively insignificant 10–20 mm (0.39–0.79 in) structure. Cases of human penis ossification following trauma have been reported, and one case was reported of a congenital os penis surgically removed from a 5-year-old boy, who also had other developmental abnormalities, including a cleft scrotum. Clellan S. Ford and Frank A. Beach in Patterns of Sexual Behavior (1951), p. 30 say, "Both gorillas and chimpanzees possess a penile bone. In the latter species, the os penis is located in the lower part of the organ and measures approximately three-quarters of an inch in length." In humans, the rigidity of the erection is provided entirely through blood pressure in the corpora cavernosa. An "artificial baculum" or penile implant is sometimes used to treat erectile dysfunction in humans.

In The Selfish Gene, Richard Dawkins proposed honest advertising as the evolutionary explanation for the loss of the baculum. The hypothesis states that if erection failure is a sensitive early warning of ill health (physical or mental), females could have gauged the health of a potential mate based on his ability to achieve erection without the support of a baculum.

The tactile stimulation hypothesis proposes that the loss of the baculum in humans is linked to the female choice for tactile stimulation: a boneless penis would be more flexible, facilitating a larger range of copulatory positions and whole body movement, giving females greater general physical stimulation.

The mating system shift hypothesis proposes that the shift towards monogamy as the dominant reproductive strategy may have reduced the intensity of copulatory and post-copulatory sexual selection, and made the baculum obsolete.

Humans "evolved a mating system in which the male tended to accompany a particular female all the time to try to ensure paternity of her children" which allows for frequent matings of short duration. Observation suggests that primates with a baculum only infrequently encounter females, but engage in longer periods of copulation that the baculum makes possible, thereby maximizing their chances of fathering the female's offspring. Human females exhibit concealed ovulation, also known as hidden estrus, meaning it is almost impossible to tell when the female is fertile (unless the cervical mucus is examined), so frequent matings would be necessary to ensure paternity.

Strengths and weaknesses of these hypotheses were revised in a 2021 study, which also proposed an alternative hypothesis: that conspecific aggression, in combination with the development of self-awareness, may have played a role in the loss. If the presence of a baculum exacerbated the prevalence and severity of penile injuries resulting from blunt trauma to a flaccid penis, increasing ability to foresee the consequences of their actions would also enable hominins to realise that these injuries are a useful tool in male-male competition. This behavioural innovation, planned conspecific aggression with the goal of temporary exclusion of competitors from the breeding pool, would create an environment in which a genetic mutation for a penis without a baculum (or with an unossified baculum) would strongly increase the fitness of the mutant phenotype. Along with the hominin propensity for social learning and cultural transmission, this hypothetical scenario may explain why this phenotype became fixed in all human populations.

An alternative view is that its loss in humans is an example of neoteny during human evolution; late-stage fetal chimpanzees lack a baculum.

== Cultural significance ==
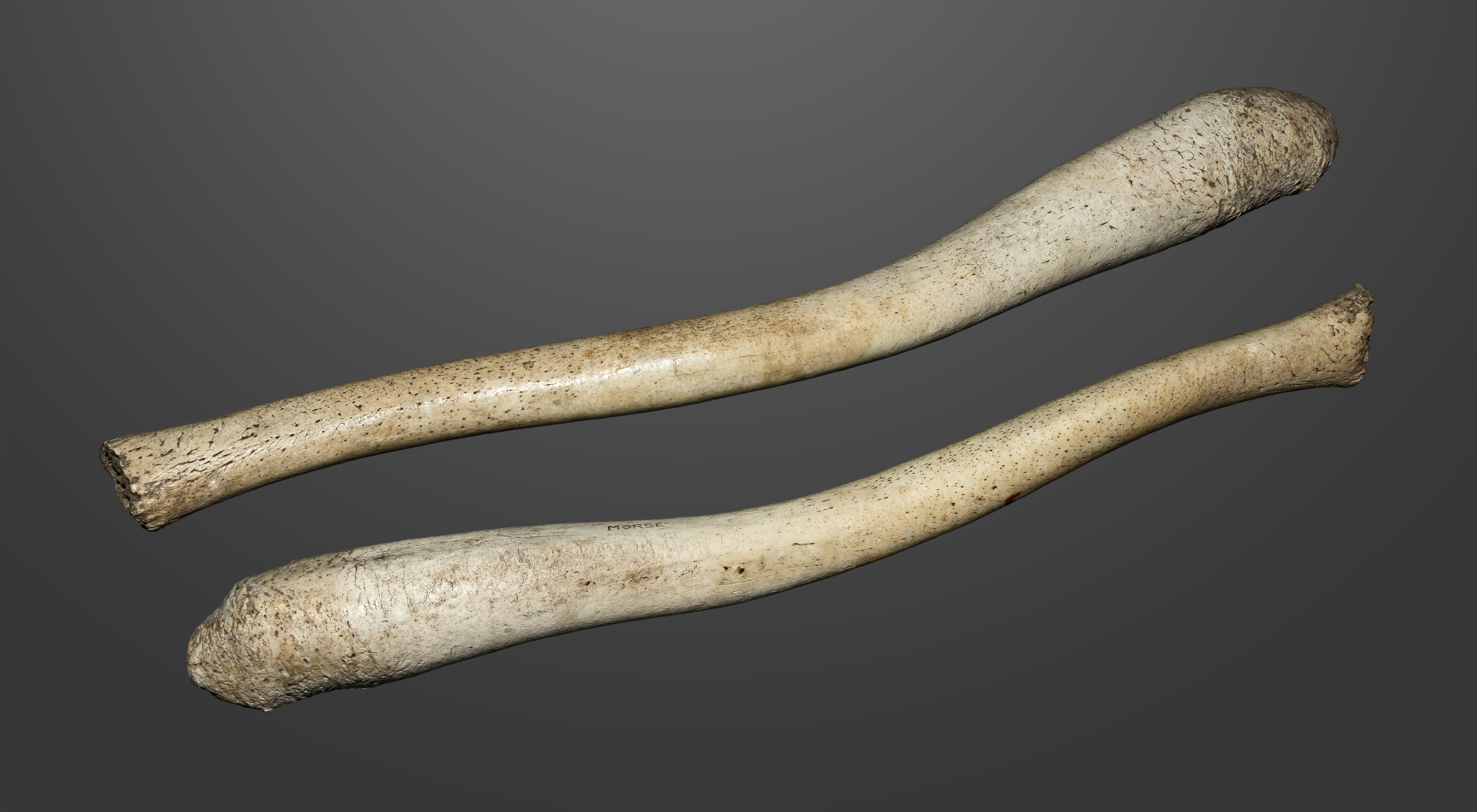
Walrus baculum, around 22 inches (56 cm) long

In a 2001 letter to the editor of the American Journal of Medical Genetics, biologist Scott F. Gilbert and biblical scholar Ziony Zevit argued the "rib" (Hebrew צֵלׇע ṣēlāʿ, also translated "flank" or "side") in the story of Adam and Eve is actually a mistranslation of a Biblical Hebrew euphemism for baculum. They also argue the removal of this bone from Adam as described in the Book of Genesis is a creation story to explain absence of baculum in humans, as well as the presence of the perineal raphe – as a resultant "scar".

In Hoodoo, the folk magic of the American South, the raccoon baculum is sometimes worn as an amulet for love or luck.

=== Oosik ===
Oosik (Iñupiaq: usuk or uzuk) is a term used in Alaska Native cultures to describe the bacula of walruses, seals, sea lions and polar bears. Sometimes as long as 60 cm (24 in), fossilized bacula are often polished and used as a handle for knives and other tools. The oosik is a polished and sometimes carved baculum of these large northern carnivores.

Oosiks are also sold as tourist souvenirs. In 2007, a 4.5 ft-long (1.4 m) fossilized penis bone from an extinct species of walrus, believed by the seller to be the largest in existence, was sold for $8,000.

United States Congressman for Alaska, Don Young, possessed an 18-inch walrus oosik, and in 1994 brandished it like a sword on the floor of the House during a congressional hearing.

== See also ==
- Argumentum ad baculum – Latin expression describing an argument based on the use of force.
- Mammal penis
- Penile spines
