= Gregory F. Ball =

American psychologist

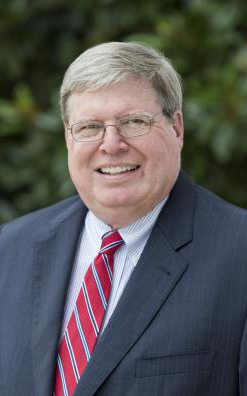
- Born: Gregory Francis Ball
- Education: Columbia University; Rutgers University
- Spouse: Margaret McCarthy
- Scientific career
- Fields: Psychology
- Workplaces: Johns Hopkins University; University of Maryland, College Park
- Thesis: Evolutionary and ecological aspects of the sexual division of parental care in barn swallows (1983)

Gregory F. Ball is an American neuroscientist, comparative neuroendocrinologist, and academic administrator whose research has advanced understanding of the neural and hormonal mechanisms underlying vocal communication, reproductive behavior, and seasonal brain plasticity in vertebrates. He is Professor of Psychology, Affiliated Professor of Biology, and a member of the Neuroscience and Cognitive Science (NACS) program at the University of Maryland, College Park, with a secondary appointment as Professor in the Department of Neurobiology at the University of Maryland School of Medicine. He previously served as Vice President for Research for the University of Maryland, College Park and the University of Maryland, Baltimore (2022–2025), and as Dean of the College of Behavioral and Social Sciences at the University of Maryland (2014–2022).

Ball is internationally recognized for pioneering research in behavioral neuroendocrinology, neuroethology, and comparative neuroscience. Using songbirds and other avian species as experimental models, his research has demonstrated how steroid hormones regulate neural plasticity, vocal learning, and reproductive behavior. He has authored more than 335 scientific publications, has a Google Scholar h-index exceeding 80, and has edited influential volumes on brain aromatase and behavioral neuroendocrinology.

Ball is a Fellow of the American Association for the Advancement of Science, the American Psychological Association, the Association for Psychological Science, and the American Ornithological Society.

== Education ==
Ball received his B.A. in psychology from Columbia University in 1977 and holds a Ph.D. in psychobiology from the Institute of Animal Behavior at Rutgers University (1983). He completed his postdoctoral research in comparative neuroendocrinology and ethology at Rockefeller University.

== Career ==
Following his postdoctoral training, Ball joined Rockefeller University in 1986 as an Assistant Professor while also serving as Assistant Director of the Rockefeller University Field Research Center in Millbrook, New York. During this period he established an independent research program investigating the hormonal regulation of reproductive behavior and vocal communication in birds, laying the foundation for his later contributions to behavioral neuroendocrinology.

In 1988 he joined Boston College as Assistant Professor of Psychology, where he expanded his research on neuroendocrine regulation of seasonal breeding and brain plasticity.

Ball joined Johns Hopkins University in 1991 as Assistant Professor of Psychology. Over the following two decades he was promoted to Associate Professor (1994) and Professor (1998), while holding joint appointments in the Department of Neuroscience, the Department of Biochemistry and Molecular Biology, and the Division of Reproductive Biology at the Bloomberg School of Public Health. His interdisciplinary appointments reflected the broad impact of his research across psychology, neuroscience, endocrinology, and reproductive biology.

In addition to his research, Ball assumed numerous academic leadership roles at Johns Hopkins. He served as Co-Director of the Undergraduate Behavioral Biology Program, Director of the Undergraduate Neuroscience Program, Acting Chair of the Department of Psychological and Brain Sciences, Special Assistant to the Dean for Research and Graduate Studies, Dean of Research and Graduate Education for the Krieger School of Arts and Sciences, and Vice Dean for Science and Research Infrastructure. In these positions he oversaw faculty development, graduate education, interdisciplinary research initiatives, and the expansion of neuroscience education.

In 2014 Ball joined the University of Maryland, College Park as Dean of the College of Behavioral and Social Sciences while also becoming Professor of Psychology, Affiliated Professor of Biology, and a faculty member in the university's Neuroscience and Cognitive Science Program. As dean, he led one of the university's largest academic colleges, supporting research, faculty recruitment, interdisciplinary initiatives, and undergraduate and graduate education across the behavioral and social sciences.

From 2022 to 2025, Ball served as Vice President for Research for both the University of Maryland, College Park and the University of Maryland, Baltimore, providing leadership for one of the largest public university research enterprises in the United States. His responsibilities included oversight of research strategy, innovation, technology commercialization, federal research initiatives, research compliance, and interdisciplinary collaboration across the two flagship institutions.

Following completion of his vice presidency in 2025, Ball returned to the faculty as Professor of Psychology and Affiliated Professor of Biology at the University of Maryland. In 2026 he also received a secondary appointment as Professor in the Department of Neurobiology at the University of Maryland School of Medicine. He continues to conduct research while mentoring graduate students and early-career scientists in behavioral neuroscience and neuroendocrinology.

== Research and scholarship ==
=== Neuroethology and birdsong ===
Ball's research has centered on understanding the neural and hormonal mechanisms underlying naturally occurring social behaviors. His work is situated within neuroethology, an interdisciplinary field that examines how nervous systems generate species-specific behaviors in natural ecological contexts. Using songbirds and other avian species as experimental models, he has investigated how endocrine signals interact with neural circuits to regulate vocal communication, courtship, territorial behavior, and seasonal reproduction.

Among Ball’s earliest contributions was to investigate how testosterone regulates a variety of reproductive behaviors in a seasonal context. Through collaborations with his mentors Peter Marler and John Wingfield, and his colleague Jacques Balthazart, among other leading neurobiologists, he helped establish how investigations of how avian species including Japanese quail and songbirds are one of the principal vertebrate systems for studying how hormones can influence not only sexual motivation but also learning, memory, and the production of complex motor behaviors.

=== Hormones and reproductive behavior ===
A major focus of Ball's research has been the relationship between steroid hormones and reproductive behavior. His laboratory demonstrated that hormones such as testosterone and estradiol exert profound effects on neural activity, motivation, and social communication through both genomic and rapid non-genomic mechanisms.

His studies clarified how seasonal changes in endocrine function alter reproductive behavior in birds and how the perception of courtship displays and courtship vocalizations can modify endocrine activity.

In addition to their effects on peripheral organs steroid hormones were shown to influence multiple regions of the brain involved in a diverse set of processes related to the occurrence of successful reproduction. This includes the sensory processing of conspecific signals, motor control, motivation, and social interactions. These findings significantly expanded understanding of hormone-dependent behavioral regulation across vertebrate species.

Ball also investigated the neuroendocrine mechanisms underlying sexual differentiation of the brain and behavior, examining how steroid hormones shape neural development and adult reproductive function. His work contributed to broader theories concerning the interaction of endocrine signals with environmental information in regulating reproductive physiology.

=== Brain aromatase and estrogen signaling ===
Ball has also made influential contributions to science based on his research on brain aromatase, the enzyme responsible for converting testosterone into estrogens within the brain. Working extensively with Belgian neuroendocrinologist Jacques Balthazart, Ball helped demonstrate that estrogens synthesized locally within neural tissue act as neuromodulators capable of rapidly influencing behavior, sensory processing, and neural plasticity. Their collaborative research challenged the traditional view that estrogens function primarily as circulating reproductive hormones. Instead, they showed that locally produced estrogens regulate neuronal communication over timescales ranging from seconds to hours, influencing auditory processing, vocal communication, and reproductive behaviors. These discoveries substantially altered scientific understanding of steroid hormone action in the vertebrate nervous system.

In 2012 Ball and Balthazart co-edited Brain Aromatase, Estrogens, and Behavior, a comprehensive reference synthesizing advances in the field and highlighting the growing importance of neuroestrogen research in neuroscience.

=== Seasonal neuroplasticity and environmental regulation ===
Ball has made significant contributions to understanding how environmental signals regulate structural and functional changes in the adult brain. His laboratory demonstrated that seasonal variation in day length, reproductive hormones, and social environment can produce substantial remodeling of neural circuits associated with vocal communication and reproductive behavior.

Using neuroanatomical, endocrinological, and behavioral approaches, he investigated how photoperiod and endocrine state influence neuronal growth, synaptic organization, and the expression of hormone receptors within song-control nuclei. These studies provided some of the earliest evidence that naturally occurring seasonal changes produce extensive neuroplasticity in the adult vertebrate brain.

=== Comparative neuroscience and scientific impact ===
Throughout his career Ball has emphasized comparative approaches to neuroscience, arguing that understanding the evolution of brain function requires studying diverse vertebrate species rather than relying exclusively on traditional laboratory mammals. His research integrates behavioral ecology, evolutionary biology, endocrinology, and neuroscience, illustrating how naturally evolved behaviors can reveal fundamental principles of brain organization. He was a member of the avian nomenclature forum which changed views on the organization of the avian brain and its homology to the mammalian brain.

He has authored more than 335 scientific publications, with a Google Scholar h-index of 88, reflecting the broad influence of his work in behavioral neuroscience, endocrinology, ornithology, and comparative biology. His publications include original research articles, review papers, edited journal issues, and the landmark volume Brain Aromatase, Estrogens, and Behavior. His research has been continuously supported for several decades by the National Institutes of Health, the National Science Foundation, and numerous international collaborative research programs.

Beyond his scientific contributions, Ball has played a leading role in mentoring graduate students, postdoctoral fellows, and early-career investigators. His influence extends across behavioral neuroendocrinology, where his work has helped establish modern understanding of the hormonal regulation of neural plasticity, vocal communication, and reproductive behavior, while shaping the development of comparative approaches to studying brain function and behavior.

== Selected awards and honors ==
- 2002 Elected Fellow, American Psychological Association (Division 6: Behavioral Neuroscience and Comparative Psychology).
- 2005 Elected Fellow, American Ornithologists Union (now the American Ornithological Society).
- 2006 National Academic Advising Association (NACADA) Region 2 Outstanding Academic Advising Award.
- 2006–2008 President-Elect, Society for Behavioral Neuroendocrinology.
- 2009 Elected Fellow, Association for Psychological Science.
- 2009–2011 President, Society for Behavioral Neuroendocrinology.
- 2011–2013 Past President, Society for Behavioral Neuroendocrinology.
- 2013 Commencement Speaker, Rutgers University–Newark Graduate Commencement Ceremony.
- 2014 Elected Fellow, American Association for the Advancement of Science (AAAS).
- 2023 Named to The Daily Record Higher Education Power List.
- 2023 Elliott Coues Award (with Jacques Balthazart), American Ornithological Society, for outstanding contributions to ornithological research.
- 2023 Daniel S. Lehrman Award for Lifetime Achievement, Society for Behavioral Neuroendocrinology.
- 2024 Donald S. Farner Medal for Excellence in Research in Avian Endocrinology, International Symposium on Avian Endocrinology.

== Books ==
- Balthazart, J., & Ball, G. F. (Eds.). (2012). Brain aromatase, estrogens, and behavior. Oxford University Press.

=== Selected publications ===
- Ball, G. F., & Silver, R. (1983). Timing of incubation bouts by ring doves (Streptopelia risoria). Journal of Comparative Psychology, 97, 213–225.
- Wingfield, J. C., Ball, G. F., Dufty, A. M., Hegner, R. E., & Ramenofsky, M. (1987). Testosterone and aggression in birds: Tests of the challenge hypothesis. American Scientist, 75, 602–608.
- Ball, G. F., Faris, P. L., Hartman, B. K., & Wingfield, J. C. (1988). Immunohistochemical localization of neuropeptides in the vocal control regions of two songbird species. Journal of Comparative Neurology, 268, 171–180.
- Marler, P., Peters, S., Ball, G. F., Dufty, A. M., & Wingfield, J. C. (1988). The role of sex steroids in the acquisition and production of birdsong. Nature, 336, 770–773.
- Nowicki, S., & Ball, G. F. (1989). Testosterone induction of song in photosensitive and photorefractory male sparrows. Hormones and Behavior, 23, 514–525.
- Silver, R., & Ball, G. F. (1989). Brain, hormone, and behavior interactions in avian reproduction: Status and prospectus. The Condor, 91, 966–978.
- Ball, G. F. (1990). Chemical neuroanatomical studies of the steroid-sensitive songbird vocal control system: A comparative approach. In Hormones, Brain, and Behaviour in Vertebrates: Sexual Differentiation.
- Ball, G. F., & Balthazart, J. (2004). Hormonal regulation of brain plasticity and reproductive behavior in birds. Trends in Neurosciences.
- Balthazart, J., & Ball, G. F. (2006). Is brain estradiol a hormone or a neurotransmitter? Trends in Neurosciences.
- Ball, G. F., & Balthazart, J. (2010). Seasonal and hormonal regulation of birdsong and neural plasticity. Frontiers in Neuroendocrinology.
- Ball, G. F., & Balthazart, J. (2015). Seasonal changes in the neuroendocrine system. Frontiers in Neuroendocrinology, 37, 1–168.
