= Bill Greiner =

American lawyer (1934–2009)

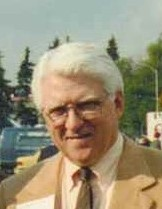
- Greiner in 1991

13th President of the University at Buffalo
- In office 1991–2004
- Preceded by: Steven Sample
- Succeeded by: John B. Simpson

Personal details
- Born: William R. Greiner; June 9, 1934 Meriden, Connecticut, U.S.
- Died: December 19, 2009 (aged 75) Cleveland, Ohio, U.S.
- Spouse: Carol (Morrissey) Greiner
- Children: Kevin, Terrence, Susan, Daniel
- Education: Yale University, Wesleyan University
- Profession: Law, Higher education, Academic administration

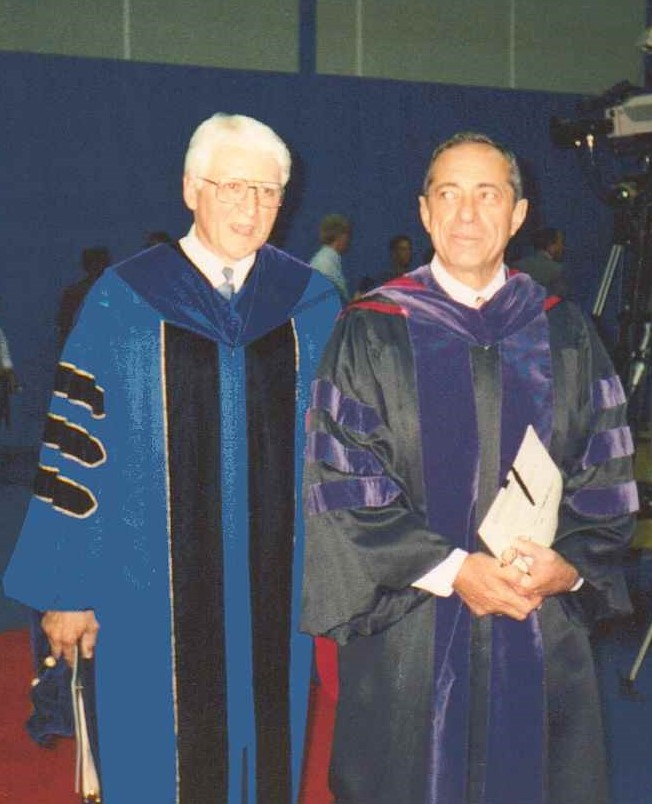
UB President William R. Greiner and NY Governor Mario Cuomo at UB, Amherst, New York, September 1992

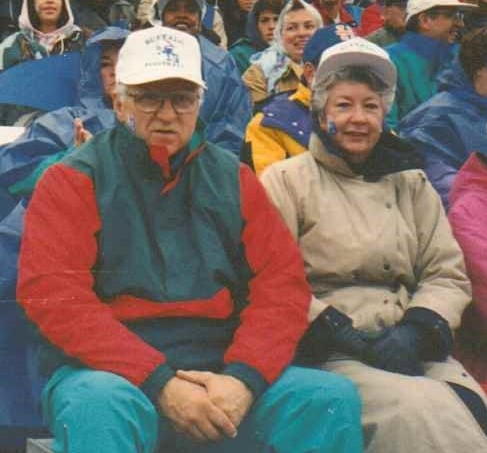
Bill and Carol Greiner at UB Homecoming Football Game, Amherst, New York, October 1992

William R. Greiner (June 9, 1934 – December 19, 2009) was President of the University at Buffalo (UB) in the State University of New York (SUNY) system from 1991 to 2004, where he worked for 42 years. Prior to becoming president, Greiner served in other capacities in the University at Buffalo Law School, and in UB's administration. He was educated at both Yale University and Wesleyan University, earning degrees in economics and law, including a doctorate in law from Yale. Under Greiner's leadership, research, educational, sports, arts, and student living complexes were constructed. Greiner co-wrote two books. He retired from UB in 2009, and died shortly thereafter due to heart surgery complications.

== Early life and education ==
William Robert Greiner was born on June 9, 1934, in Meriden, Connecticut. An individual of Irish and German heritages, Greiner was raised in Meriden as an only child. Greiner met Carol Morrissey, who would become his wife, when they were young children in Meriden. Greiner was awarded scholarships to both Wesleyan University and Yale University; and he worked during his time as a student. Greiner earned his baccalaureate degree in economics from Wesleyan University; and three subsequent degrees from Yale University. At Yale, Greiner earned a master's in economics, master's in law, and doctorate in law. Before entering law school, Greiner married Carol Morrisey. They then had four children - Kevin, Terrence, Susan, and Daniel - within five years. Prior to taking a position as a UB Law School faculty member in 1967, Bill was a School of Business faculty member at the University of Washington in Seattle.

== University at Buffalo career ==
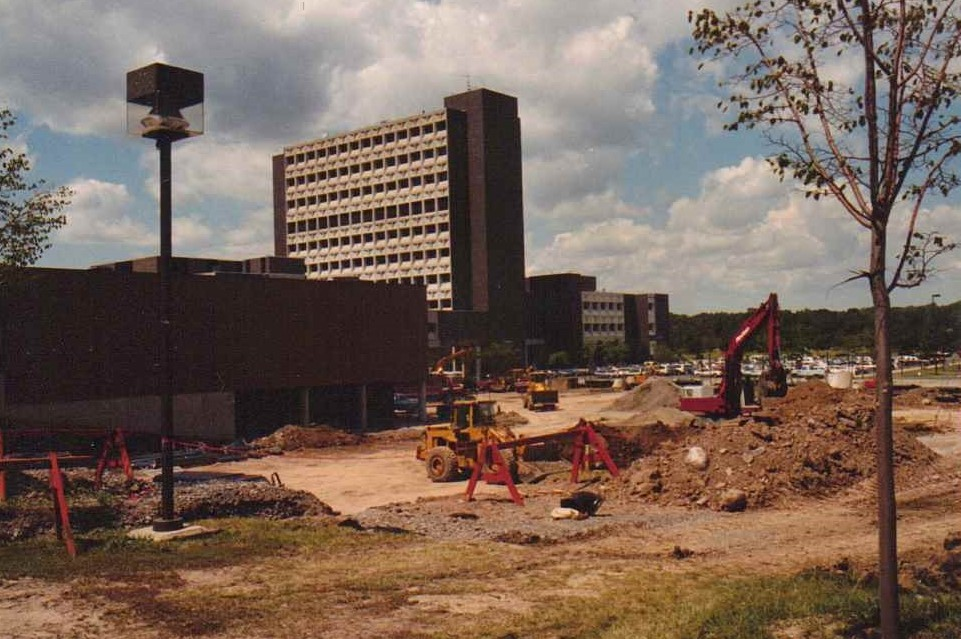
UB Student Union Construction, 1991

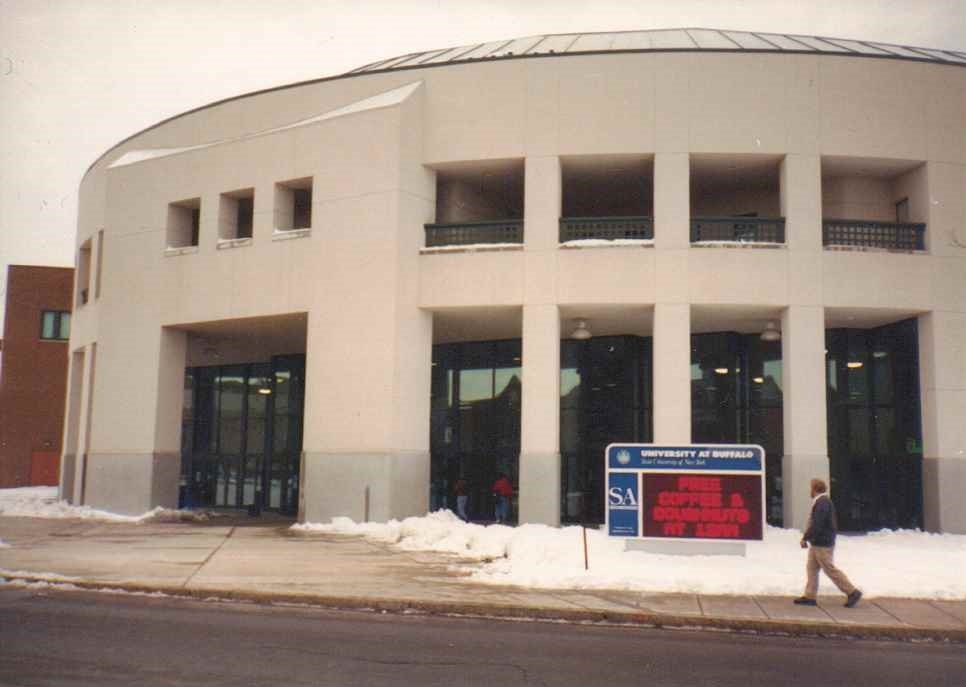
UB Student Union, 1992

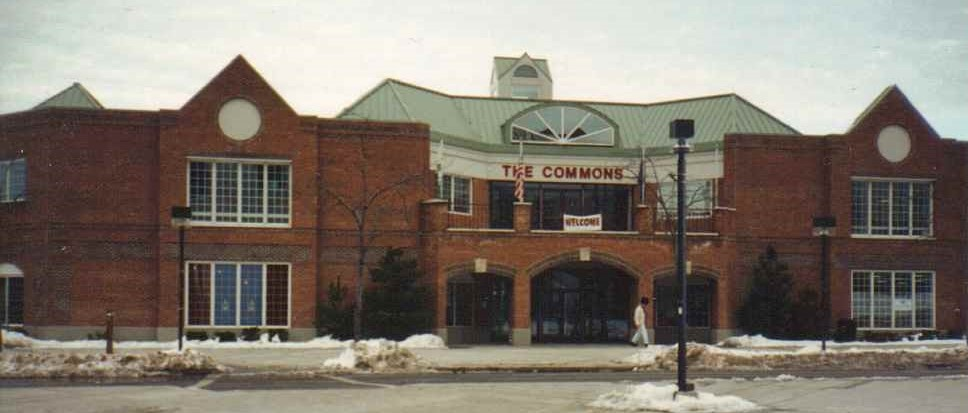
The Commons at UB, 1992

=== Early career ===
Greiner began his career at UB in 1967 as a member of the University at Buffalo Law School, serving as Chair of the Legal Studies Department. He also served as Associate Provost and Associate Dean of the Law School. From 1980 to 1983, Greiner was Associate Vice President for Academic Affairs; and from 1983 to 1984, he served as Interim Vice President for Academic Affairs. Greiner became UB's first Provost in 1984 prior to serving as Interim President between from 1991 to 1992. Among the classes Greiner taught at UB were Honors seminars, including Law and the Legal Process and Introduction to Law. Greiner also taught other classes in the UB Law School, including Tax Law and Property Law.

=== University at Buffalo presidency ===
==== Highlights ====
There are highlights of Greiner's career at UB. Educational and research buildings and complexes were constructed during his leadership. Greiner also provided the impetus for the creation of the biomedical education and research buildings, mathematics building, natural sciences complex, School of Management additions, and others. During Greiner's tenure, the Student Union and The Commons were built. The UB Center for the Arts was constructed, including the transfer to UB of the Anderson Gallery. The University at Buffalo Stadium was also constructed. Established were the Office of Public Service and Urban Affairs and the School of Public Health and Health Professions; and the College of Arts and Sciences was reconstituted. A UB admissions office was established in New York City.

While Greiner was president, a fundraising campaign was conducted that was the largest in UB's and SUNY's histories. The Campaign for UB: Generation to Generation, raised $291,600,000 for UB. By locating a previously unused state law saying that alumni associations can utilize private monies for dormitories, Greiner's research led to the construction of five apartment-style buildings for 2,100 UB students. He was the leader in policy change for SUNY campuses in managing their own tuition monies.

Greiner secured NCAA Division I-A status for the Buffalo Bulls. UB Athletics Director Warde Manuel has stated that Bill is known as "the Father of UB Division I-A athletics." Greiner and his wife, Carol, hosted welcomes and send-offs for UB Honors students, including freshman entering UB, at their LeBrun Road home in Amherst, New York. The UB Honors Program was tripled under Greiner's leadership, with an increase in the number and amount of scholarships provided to Honors students, including for those studying abroad by $60,000.

===== International education partnerships =====
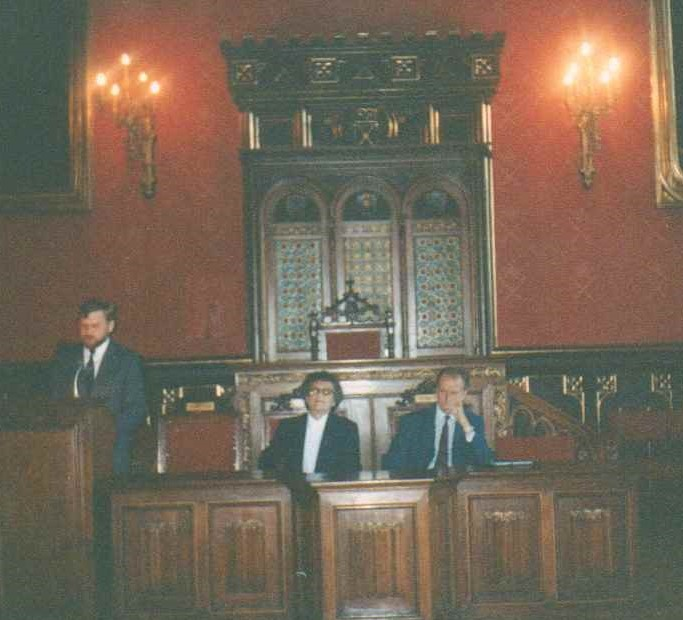
Alexander Koj (Rector, Speaking) and Officials at Jagiellonian University, Kraków, Poland, July 1992

Educational partnerships that Greiner established for UB were with other universities in Poland, Turkey, and Cuba. In 1990, a formal exchange agreement was created between UB and the Jagiellonian University in Kraków, Poland, although both universities had a long-standing partnership prior to that time. In 1993 and during Greiner's tenure, the two universities expanded their agreement to include additional joint programs for students, faculty, and staff. While Greiner served as UB Provost, his actions aided the development of a relationship between UB and the Jagiellonian University.

In November 2002, Greiner led a delegation to Turkey, and signed an agreement with Istanbul Technical University for student and faculty exchanges. Greiner further developed international education ties with Cuba in 1999 regarding UB's program in Havana with Fernando Remirez de Estenoz, Cuban envoy to the United States. Under Greiner's leadership, UB became the first university in the United States to establish a partnership with China, with a university center in Beijing.

==== Concerns ====
Under Greiner's tenure, there were also concerns and controversy regarding several issues. In 1993, UB's basketball team was placed on probation by the NCAA for rules violations from 1989. By 1997, two of the team's coaches had been identified as having illegally watched and attended scrimmage games. Greiner was supposedly unaware of these actions, placing responsibility for them on UB's athletic director, Nelson Townshend. Resulting from this in 2001 was that UB's annual recruitment visits were decreased by two throughout the next two years, after UB had already voluntarily reduced annual recruitment visits by two. So, annual recruitment visits were decreased, overall, from 12 to 8, a reduction that UB's administration believed to be unnecessarily harsh and planned to appeal.

In 1996, UB held a university-wide referendum that was open to students regarding two issues on Greiner's agenda, including privatization and differential tuition. Michael Pierce, the University Council Student Representative who penned the referendum, stated that the issue was not about confidence, or lack thereof, in Greiner, but that new directions he proposed should "get a mandate from the university." Greiner stated that students should be concerned about affordability and accessibility rather than whether or not one SUNY institution costs more to attend than another. Of the 300 UB students who rallied about the issues on the UB Amherst Campus and who proceeded, en masse, to Greiner's office, the UB president stated that their actions were "divisive," that he was "not moved," and that they should register to vote in Erie County.

In October 1998, Cuthbert Ormond Simpkins, a surgeon and UB professor in the School of Medicine and Biomedical Sciences of four years, was denied tenure by Greiner. At the time, Simpkins was suing UB, having claimed that the UB clinical practice plan funds were being misused. Through his lawsuit, he was attempting to obtain plan audit access. Simpkins received a letter dated October 1998 from UB Provost Thomas Headrick thanking him for his service, including a statement from Greiner that denied him continued support for a tenure track position. No reason was given in the letter for Greiner's removal of support for tenure of Simpkins.

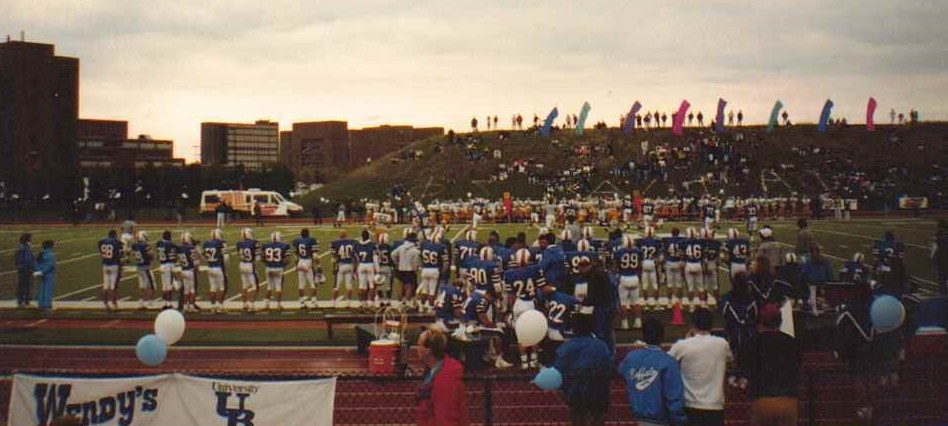
UB Bulls vs. Canisius at UB, October 1991

Quoted about UB's football program in The Buffalo News, Greiner stated, "Football is tough." Prior to 1977, UB's football record was .500, though budget cuts reduced the program beginning in 1977. After Greiner secured the move to Division I-A in 1999, the UB football team lost 21 of 23 games in its first two seasons. UB's record from 1999 to 2003 was 6-39 (.153) since joining the I-A level, and 3-29 (.103) versus MAC division opponents during that time period. The football team struggled for several years to be competitive in the Mid-American Conference (MAC), disclosing losses of $2.2 million associated with football as of 2003, and prior to moving to and remaining at the classification that is now known as the Football Bowl Subdivision (FBS) as of 2013. Before the 2013 season, the team was ranked one of the ten worst FBS teams in the nation. Greiner stated that reasons for building UB's athletic program included the attraction of out-of-state students, and alumni.

Greiner was the subject of a vote of no confidence in 2000. from the university's faculty senate, prompting discussion over whether he would resign his position. Student enrollment had declined, full-time faculty positions had decreased by 100 people, and funding was being more specifically directed to certain programs, such as athletics and information technology, rather than others. In particular was the concern that more than $10 million per year was going toward building UB's athletic programs, such monies being diverted away from academics. While college entrance Scholastic Aptitude Test (SAT) scores had increased, UB's status as a highly ranked research university in the United States had decreased since 1989 under the leadership of Steven Sample. This prompted the vote of no confidence in UB's leadership by the College of Arts and Sciences professors. Of the no confidence vote, in 2001 Greiner likened himself to a lightning rod that, in his employment position, occasionally gets hit by lightning.

In April 2000, Greiner responded to a story published in The Buffalo News by UB English professor Mark Shechner with an op-ed article, published in the same newspaper. Greiner called Shechner's concerns about UB an exaggeration. Greiner rebutted Shechner's concerns regarding UB's reductions in student enrollment, the number of full-time faculty, decreased monies directed toward academics, and others. Among issues addressed by Greiner were the expanded use of student activity fees, UB's partnerships in the community, the state's capital investment program of nearly $200 million, more than $50 million used for student housing, and that UB adds $1.6 billion to the local economy in the Buffalo area.

In a May 2000 Buffalo News editorial, UB Professor and 20-year UB employee Charles Trzcinka wrote that he was preparing to leave UB after his department was negatively affected by the president's decisions, but that he believed that Greiner should remain as UB's president. In his editorial, Trzcinka stated that UB is performing poorly based on "many traditional measures," but is doing well by less traditional standards. Tzcinka stated that Greiner focused on building particular areas and departments at UB, while that was not done with others, contributing to decreases in numbers of faculty and students in those departments. Pointed out by Tzcinka was that information technology at UB has caused UB to be ranked highly, and that it is a source of economic growth for the region. Tzcinka also stated that university presidents must make decisions, and that while UB has faced declining resources and budget cuts, Greiner made UB a "dynamic, responsive university."

Concern also exists that Greiner did not do more to develop UB's city campus location in Buffalo, including that property values and business development faltered in the University Heights district because of it. Residents of the University Heights district stated that the construction of the apartment-style dormitory buildings on the suburban Amherst campus shows that the city campus in Buffalo is "excluded" from development. UB also stopped plans to purchase 250 homes in the University Heights area throughout a period of 10 years. Greiner stated that UB is working "to play a larger role" in the University Heights area, but that a partnership must exist. He also said that after construction began on the Amherst campus, UB's future growth was foretold.

=== Retirement ===
Greiner served as UB's 13th President for 13 years before stepping down in 2004 and returning to the role of Law Professor, retiring in 2009. As UB President in 2004, Grenier earned more than $235,000 annually, and had use of the presidential residence that was paid for by the UB Foundation. In 1997, he earned $170,000 as UB President. Upon returning to teaching in the UB Law School as professor, Greiner became the highest-paid UB Law School professor, earning $206,000 per year. Just prior to his death, Greiner was named Professor Emeritus at UB.

== Honors ==
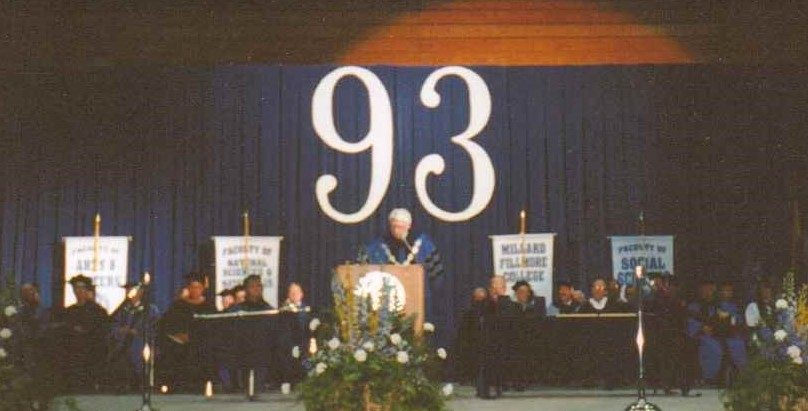
Bill Greiner Speaking at 1993 UB Graduation

In 1995, Greiner received the Medal Merentibus, the highest honor issued by the Jagiellonian University in Kraków, Poland, for his efforts in broadening the educational partnership between both institutions. Greiner was awarded the Medal by Jagiellonian University Rector Alexander Koj for his personal support, initiative, and assistance in developing cooperative programs between the two universities. In 2003, Greiner received the Chancellor Charles P. Norton medal, the highest honor bestowed at UB. Both Greiner and his wife, Carol, received the Newman Award in 2003 for their contributions to UB. The William R. Greiner Scholarship Fund was established in 2004. The $250,000 scholarship fund provides full-tuition scholarships to UB law students of merit who have evidenced community commitment to the Western New York area, leadership ability, and public service dedication.

In 2004, both Bill and his wife, Carol, were honored at a UB Alumni Association dinner with the Dr. Philip B. Wels Outstanding Service Award. Those at UB who have provided dedication and long-term service to UB that is outstanding are given the award. In 2007, Retired Starbucks Chief Executive Officer Orin C. Smith donated $200,000 to the UB Law School in honor of Greiner. Smith had taken a Constitutional Law class, taught by Grenier at the University of Washington. Through the class, Smith was inspired to apply to Harvard University. As a result of Smith's donation, a room in honor of Greiner was created in the UB Law Library. The Professor William R. Greiner Faculty Reading Room was opened through Smith's gift.

Prior to Greiner stepping down as UB President, the UB Student Government announced that it would place a statue of a buffalo in the Student Union, naming it "Billy" in honor of Greiner. In 2010, Greiner was honored by being inducted to the UB Athletic Hall of Fame of the UB Alumni Association. At UB's Amherst Campus, a dormitory complex was named for Greiner. Greiner also received the Edwin F. Jaeckle Award, the highest award bestowed by the University at Buffalo Law School and Law Alumni Association.

== Memberships ==
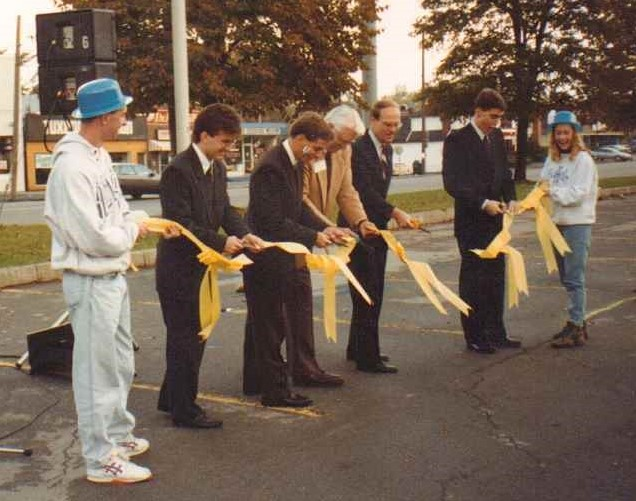
Bill Greiner (Center) with Dennis Gorski and UB Student Government Leaders Cutting Homecoming Ribbon, Buffalo, NY, October 1991

Greiner was a member of professional associations and organizations throughout his career. As a member of the Council on Competitiveness and the Business-Higher Education Forum, Greiner participated in the New York State Senate Higher Education Advisory Committee and the SUNY Chancellor's Advisory Council on State Needs. He represented UB in the Association of American Universities. He was a member of the Western New York Health Sciences Consortium and the Western New York Consortium of Higher Education.

Greiner had professional involvements outside of UB. He was admitted to the Bar in New York and Connecticut. He chaired the Western New York Regional Economic Development Council; and he was a member of the Erie County Bar Association, the Buffalo Academy of Fine Arts, and the Buffalo Council on World Affairs. He was also a board member of the Buffalo Philharmonic Orchestra, Studio Arena Theatre, the Greater Buffalo Partnership, and the United Way of Buffalo and Erie County.

Greiner was a board member of Leadership Buffalo and the Greater Buffalo Development Foundation. He also held memberships with the Buffalo Niagara Enterprise Council and Success by Six. In the area of healthcare, he was a board member of Kaleida Health in the Buffalo area. Both the Buffalo Mayor and Buffalo Common Council, as well as the Town of Amherst Board of Supervisors and the Erie County Executive have consulted with Greiner on issues related to municipal government. Greiner was named to a committee at Erie Community College by former Erie County Executive Joel Giambra to make appointment recommendations to the college's board of trustees.

Greiner was a member of the Thursday Club of the Buffalo area. The Thursday Club is an exclusively male club of about 60 notable men, mostly educators and attorneys. The club has been in existence for more than 130 years, and was originally established as a type of literary club that included notable men. In 1998, the Thursday Club held a dinner meeting at UB, prompting a woman to write a letter to Greiner and other SUNY administrators regarding the possible violation of a private club that discriminates against women holding a meeting at a state-run institution. The Buffalo News quoted the letter, stating, "I do not know if it is a violation of state law or university policy to use university facilities to support the activities of a private club that discriminates against women, but it strikes me, at the very least, as a wildly inappropriate violation of judgment and good taste."

== Authorships ==
Greiner co-wrote The Nature and Functions of Law with Harold J. Berman (1918–2007) of Harvard University and Samir N. Salima of Emory and Henry College. There are six editions of the book in print, the first published in 1966. Greiner and Thomas E. Headrick of the University at Buffalo co-authored Location, Location, Location: A Special History of the University of/at Buffalo in 2007.

=== Books ===
- Berman, Harold J.; Greiner, William R.; Saliba, Samir N. (2004). The Nature and Functions of Law (6th ed.). St. Paul, MN: Foundation Press/West Academic. OL 2977185W. (First Edition, 1966).
- Greiner, William R.; Headrick, Thomas E. (2007). Location, Location, Location: A Special History of the University of/at Buffalo. Buffalo, NY: Center Working Papers/University at Buffalo. ISBN 978-0931627248. OL 22861147M.

== Later life ==
Greiner experienced heart problems and declining health, having heart bypass surgery in 2009. While at the Cleveland Clinic in Ohio in December 2009, another heart surgery was performed, and he died due to complications from it. Of Bill's death, his wife, Carol, stated in Buffalo Business First, "We are saddened for the future generation of UB students who will never get to benefit from his knowledge and teaching, and his gift as an educator."

Academic offices
Preceded by Steven Sample	13th President of the University at Buffalo; 1991-2004	Succeeded by John B. Simpson
