= Jacques Balthazart =

Belgian biologist

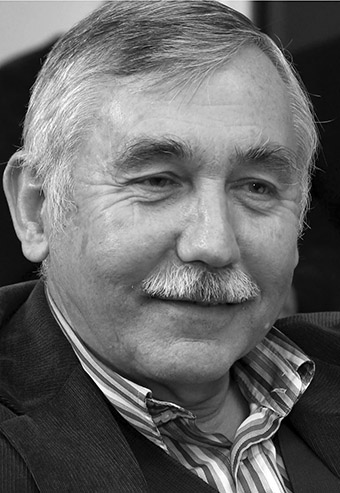
Jacques Balthazart, Belgian endocrinologist

Jacques Balthazart (born June 29, 1949, Liège) is a Belgian biologist who specializes in behavioral neuroendocrinology, author of multiple publications and working at the University of Liège.

He is currently director emeritus of the Research Group in Behavioral Neurobiology at the GIGA Neurosciences of the University of Liège.

== Career ==
Jacques Balthazart obtained his PhD in Zoological Sciences from the University of Liège in 1977 and was then for one year a post-doctoral fellow at Rutgers University in Newark, N.J, where he worked under the leadership of Professor Mei Fang Cheng and Harvey Feder. He was Adjunct Faculty at Rockefeller University in 1987-1989 and has since organized and developed a research group in Behavioral Neuroendocrinology at the University of Liège where he has continuously worked from 1979 till now. His publications on Researchgate reach the score of 7084 downloads, 14529 citations et 29.788 views., and his score on Google Scholar reaches 17 355 quotations, which ranks him in the top 1% of the scientists category.

He is Co-Editor-in-Chief of the journal Frontiers in Neuroendocrinology published by Elsevier and one of the three Editors of the Oxford Series in Behavioral Neuroendocrinology, a collection of books published by Oxford University Press. He is member of the editorial board of several journals including Hormones and Behavior (Elsevier), Acta Ethologica (Springer), Ethology Ecology and Evolution and the Belgian Journal of Zoology.

He is Honorary Fellow of the American Ornithologists' Union. He is an active member of multiple scientific societies including the Society for Neuroscience, the Society for Behavioral Neuroendocrinology of which he has been president in 2003–2005) , The Endocrine Society, la Société Européenne des Neurosciences, la Society for Animal Behavior.

=== Research ===
Research by Jacques Balthazart and his group addresses various topics in behavioral neuroendocrinology but focuses mostly on the sexual differentiation of brain and behavior and on the role of brain aromatase (estrogen synthase) in the activation of male sexual behavior. Several of these topics were covered in more detail in the scientific magazine of the University of Liège called Reflexion. This web site namely contains a detailed description in French and in English of his research concerning :

- The rapid changes in brain aromatase activity and the rapid effects of estrogens on sexual behavior;
- The important steroid-dependent brain plasticity observed in song birds,
- The role of olfaction in the control of avian reproduction.

His publications can also be found in the repository of the University of Liège called ORBI.

He published in 2010 a book in French entitled Biologie de l'homosexualité. On nait homosexuel, on ne choisit pas de l'être summarizing the current knowledge on the biological mechanisms that control sexual orientation in animals and humans. This book has been often discussed and reviewed as scientific attempt to reduce the gap between the American and English approach in neurobiology on the subject of homosexuality, and the south-European vision which is more based on psychology and psycho-analysis. Radio channels like France Culture have organized debates over this change or perspective Newspapers like Le Monde, the Nouvel Observateur have extensively commented his works, and a 50 minutes TV documentary, produced by Mona Lisa Corp, titled Homo ou hétéro, est-ce un choix ?, by Thierry Berrod, has been aired on French national channel France 3 that has given a large audience to his theories, after being featured in Belgium on national TV RTBF in November 2014. Spain and Italy have reacted as well, following the English translation by Oxford University Press. A shorter presentation of the scientific data including an overview on sex differences is also available in English as a paper or ebook (cf."Brain development and Sexual orientation", see full references in the list below). A summary of these facts is also presented in the Reflexions Web site of the University of Liege. This book also supports the scientific argument developed in Christian Combaz' historical and sociological essay Les âmes douces in which Jacques Balthazart is often quoted as a scientific counsellor.

== Publications ==
The full list of the more than 380 publications of Jacques Balthazart can be found on the PUBMED web site that gathers all the biomedical scientific literature and where the author has his own page.

=== Edited books ===
- Aspects of Avian Endocrinology: Practical and Theoretical Implications, with C.G. Scanes, M.A. Ottinger, A.D Kenny, J. Cronshaw & I. Chester-Jones, eds; Grad. Studies, Texas Tech, Univ. 1982, vol 26, p. 411.
- Hormones and Behavior in Higher Vertebrates, with E. Prove & R. Gilles, eds; Springer Verlag, Berlin 1983, p. 489.
- Neurobiology, Current Comparative Approaches, with R. Gilles, eds; Proceedings in Life Sciences, Springer Verlag, Berlin, 1985, p. 415.
- Molecular and Cellular Basis of Social Behavior in Vertebrates, Advances in Comparative and Environmental Physiology, vol 3, Springer Verlag, Berlin, 1989, p. 356.
- Hormones, Brain and Behavior in Vertebrates, 1, Sexual differentiation, neuroanatomical aspects, neurotransmitters and neuropeptides, Comp. Physiol, Karger, vol 8, Basel, 1990 p. 226.
- Hormones, Brain and Behavior in Vertebrates, 2, Behavioral activation in males and females-Social interactions and reproductive endocrinology, Comp. Physiol., Karger, vol 9., Basel, 1990, p. 223.
- Hormones, Brain, and Behaviour, proceedings of the International Conference held in Tours, France, 24-27 aout, 1993, with J.P. Signoret et C. Fabre-Nys, eds, Psychoneuroendocrinology, vol 19 (5/7), p. 403-721.
- Proceedings of the Vth International conference on Hormones, Brain and Behavior, Turin, Italy, 1997, with G.C. Panzica, Brain Research Bulletin vol 44 (4) 1994, p. 319-558.
- Brain aromatase, estrogens and behavior, with G. F. Ball, Oxford University Press, New York USA, 2012, p. 530.

=== Monographs ===
- Biologie de l'homosexualité. On nait homosexuel, on ne choisit pas de l'être, Mardaga, Wavre B, 2010, p. 299. ISBN 978-2804700379
- The biology of homosexuality, Oxford University Press, New York NY USA, 2011, p. 208. ISBN 978-0199838820
- Brain development and sexual orientation. Colloquium Series in the Developing Brain, Morgan and Claypool Life Sciences, 2012, p. 123. ISBN 978-1615044580
