= John B. Simpson =

John Barclay Simpson
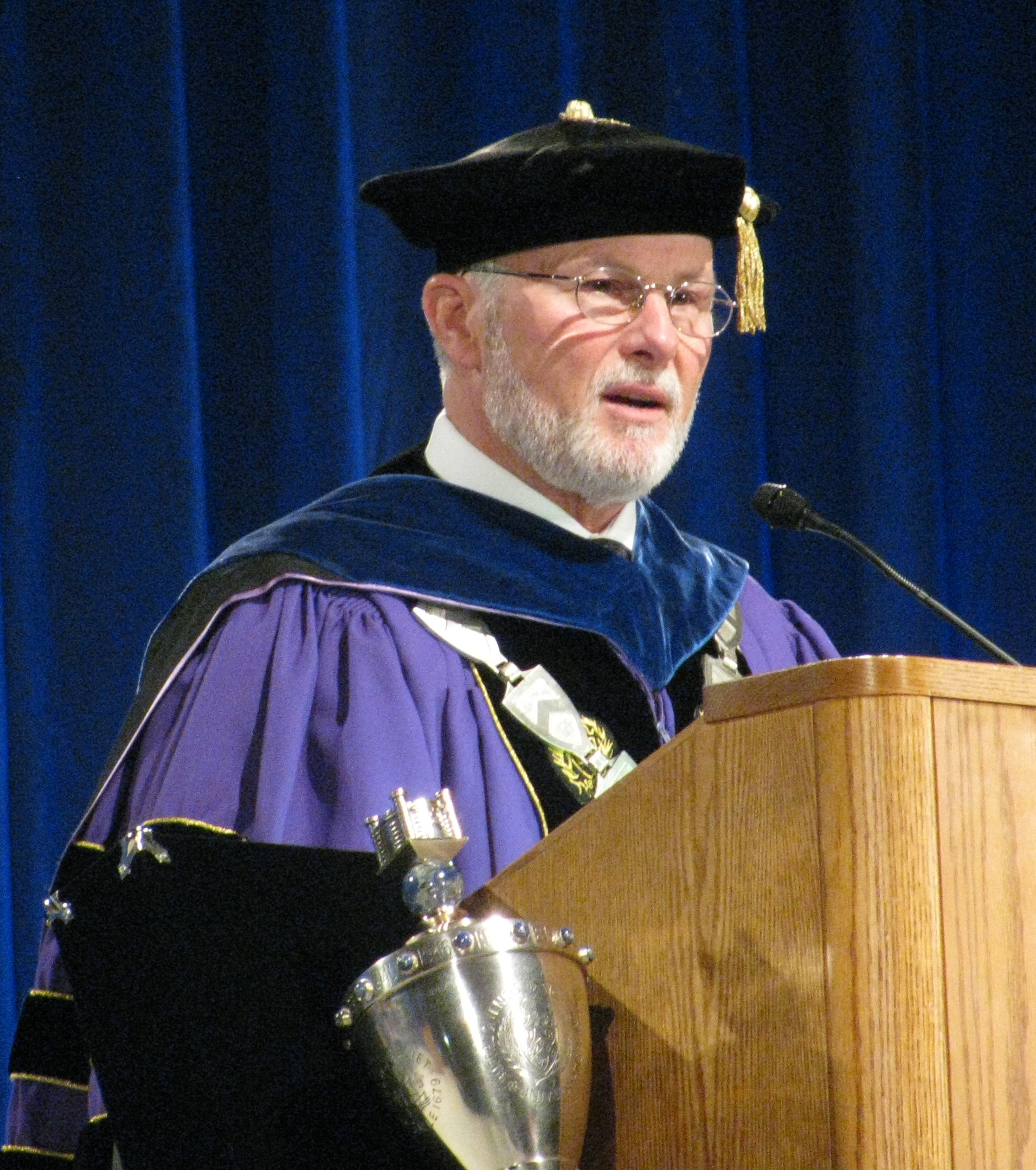

14th President of the University of Buffalo
- In office January 1, 2004 – January 15, 2011
- Preceded by: William R. Greiner
- Succeeded by: Satish K. Tripathi

Personal details
- Born: June 8, 1947 (age 79) Alameda County, California
- Spouse: Katherine Simpson
- Children: 2
- Education: University of California at Santa Barbara; Northwestern University; University of Pennsylvania
- Profession: Neuroendocrinology

John Barclay Simpson (born June 8, 1947) is a former president of the University at Buffalo (UB), part of the State University of New York (SUNY) system. He assumed this position on January 1, 2004, after leaving his position as executive vice chancellor and provost of the University of California, Santa Cruz. On August 30, 2010, Simpson announced his retirement from the post of UB President effective January 2011.

A research scientist specializing in neuroendocrinology, physiology, and behavior, Simpson was named to the faculty of UB's Department of Physiology and Biophysics. He guided the campus through significant curricular developments, overseeing the creation of new graduate programs in digital arts and new media, bioinformatics, electrical engineering, and politics.

== Education ==
Simpson received his master's and doctoral degrees in neurobiology and behavior from Northwestern University in 1972 and 1973, respectively. He received his bachelor's degree in psychology from the University of California, Santa Barbara.

=== Honorary degrees ===
In 2007, Simpson also received an honorary doctorate degree from Tokyo University of Agriculture and Technology, in recognition of his commitment to leadership regarding international education partnerships through UB.

== Career ==
=== Early career ===
Simpson spent two years at the University of Pennsylvania as a research associate of the Institute of Neurological Sciences in the Department of Biology. He has been a visiting professor of physiology at the University of California, San Francisco School of Medicine, and at the Howard Florey Institute of Experimental Physiology and Medicine at the University of Melbourne in Australia where he bred and raised kangaroos.

=== University of Washington in Seattle ===
For 23 years, Simpson was a member of the faculty of psychology at the University of Washington (UW) in Seattle, serving as director of the university's joint physiology-psychology program for four years from 1984 to 1988, and as head of the physiological psychology area from 1986 to 1990 before his appointment as associate dean for computing, facilities and research in the UW College of Arts and Sciences in 1991. Subsequently, he was appointed dean of the College of Arts and Sciences in 1994.

=== Research ===
Simpson's research is in neuroendocrinology, the study of brain and hormone interaction. He received research support for his laboratory from the National Institutes of Health, and has published widely on the subjects of brain controls of body fluid and cardiovascular regulation, the renin–angiotensin system, and the brain's circumventricular organs.

=== University of California, Santa Cruz ===
In 1998, Simpson assumed the post of executive vice chancellor at University of California, Santa Cruz, and served for five years.

=== University at Buffalo ===
Simpson assumed the post of UB President in 2004. He had a vision for UB to become the premier public research university in the northeast. Simpson's plan included expanding UB's student population by 10,000 and increasing the faculty by 750 over the course of 13 years. Simpson lobbied lawmakers with his plans, but ultimately needed additional monies for the expansion from government leaders in Albany that did not come through. UB's fundraising efforts through philanthropy could have provided $30 million for the expansion. However, the New York State Legislature did not pass the Public Higher Education Empowerment and Innovation Act. The Act would have provided UB with the opportunity to generate needed funding to forward the UB 2020 plan, following $60 million in state budget cuts to the school.

== Retirement ==
On August 30, 2010, Simpson notified the University at Buffalo Council that he would retire. On January 5, 2011 Simpson said that he would remain on as President until a successor was announced. He extended his retirement date by two weeks, retiring on January 15, 2011, at the request of the Council. He stated that he and his wife were going to return to their "West Coast home."

Of his decision to retire as UB President, Washington, DC's Targeted News Service quoted Simpson stating, in part, on August 30, 2010:

It is one I have made with great satisfaction in all that this university community has achieved together over the past several years, in those areas we control. I retain full confidence that UB can become the premier public research university we have been working together to build.

Simpson was succeeded by Satish K. Tripathi as UB President.

== Current and former memberships ==
- Board of Directors of the SUNY Research Foundation
- Buffalo Niagara Partnership Board of Directors
- Buffalo Niagara Enterprise
- American Association for the Advancement of Science
- Society for Neuroscience
- Society for the Study of Ingestive Behavior
- Board of directors of the Buffalo Fine Arts Academy, the governing body of the Albright-Knox Art Gallery
- Pilchuck Glass School, Trustee
- Council on Competitiveness
- Erie County Rare Books Commission
- New York State Commission on Higher Education
- American Council on Education's Commission on International Initiatives
- Commissioner of the Western Association of Schools and Colleges
- Intiman Theater Company, Seattle
- Henry Art Gallery, Seattle

== Honors ==
- 2009 Theodore Roosevelt Award for Exemplary Citizenship and Service from the Theodore Roosevelt Inaugural Site Foundation.
- 2013 Charles P. Norton Medal from UB

== Personal life ==
A native of Oakland, California, Simpson is married to his wife, Katherine, and they have two adult children. In his spare time, Simpson enjoys skiing, biking, and fishing; and he is an art enthusiast.

Academic offices
Preceded by William R. Greiner	14th President of the University at Buffalo; 2004-2011	Succeeded by Satish K. Tripathi
