= Simpkins =

Simpkins is a surname, and may refer to:

- Andy Simpkins (1932–1999), American jazz musician
- Charles Simpkins (born 1963), American Olympic athlete
- Chris Simpkins (born c. 1950), Chief Executive of the Falkland Islands 2003–2007
- C. O. Simpkins, Sr. (1925–2019), American politician and civil rights activist
- Cuthbert Ormond Simpkins (born 1947), American physician, biographer, and historian
- Dickey Simpkins (born 1972), American professional basketball player
- James Simpkins (1910–2004), Canadian cartoonist and artist
- John Simpkins (1862–1898), American politician from Massachusetts; U.S. representative 1895–98
- Luke Simpkins (born 1964), Australian politician from Western Australia
- Michael Simpkins (born 1978), English professional football player
- Paul Simpkins (contemporary), Australian professional rugby league referee
- Ron Simpkins (born 1958), American professional football player
- Ryan Simpkins (born 1988), Australian Rugby League player
- Ryan Simpkins (born 1998), American actress
- Torricelli Simpkins III (born 2002), American football player
- Ty Simpkins (born 2001), American actor
