= Frank A. Beach =

American ethologist

- Born: April 13, 1911; Emporia, Kansas
- Died: June 15, 1988 (aged 77); Berkeley, California
- Education: Antioch College
- Known for: founder of behavioral endocrinology, co-author of Patterns of Sexual Behavior (1951)
- Scientific career
- Fields: ethology

Frank Ambrose Beach, Jr. (April 13, 1911 – June 15, 1988) was an American ethologist, best known as co-author of the 1951 book Patterns of Sexual Behavior. He is often regarded as the founder of behavioral endocrinology, as his publications marked the beginnings of the field.

== Early education and career ==
Frank Ambrose Beach, Jr. was born in Emporia, Kansas, the first of three children to Frank Ambrose Beach and Bertha Robinson Beach. Although he respected his father, a distinguished Professor of Music at Kansas State Teachers College (now Emporia State University), Frank Beach Jr. often rebelled against him. Frank A. Beach Jr. rarely used the Jr. associated with his name. Beach began an English major at Emporia, with the intent to become a high school English teacher. Beach was a poor student, receiving D's and F's at Emporia, so he was sent to Antioch College for his sophomore year to regain his focus.

Beach returned to Emporia, where he took his first psychology course with James B. Stroud, who would prove to be an important influence in his life. Beach graduated in 1932, right in the middle of the Great Depression. Beach was unable to find a job in teaching, so he accepted a fellowship in clinical psychology at Emporia to earn his master's degree. Beach completed a thesis on color vision in rats. After completing his master's degree, he moved to the University of Chicago, to accept a fellowship from psychologist Harvey Carr, who had trained his former mentor, James B. Stroud. In Chicago, Beach met and worked with behaviorist Karl Lashley, who had perhaps the strongest influence on Beach's professional life. Financial difficulties forced Beach to leave Chicago, and took a high school teaching position in Yates Center, Kansas, where he married his first wife. The union was short-lived.

Beach returned to the University of Chicago in 1935, and completed, under the supervision of Harvey Carr, a PhD thesis on the role the neocortex on innate maternal behavior in rats. Although Beach completed his dissertation in 1936, he did not receive the degree until 1940 due to his inability to pass the foreign language portion of the degree requirements. During this period, Beach married his second wife, Anna Beth Odenweller, with whom he had two children, Frank and Susan. In 1936, Beach accepted a one-year position at Karl Lashley's Cambridge laboratory, where he continued his studies of animal sexual behavior.

== Professional career ==
In 1937, Beach was employed by the American Museum of Natural History in New York City. Beach was influential in advancing the study of neural and endocrinal influences on animal behavior. Beach remained at the Museum for 10 years. Beach organized an effort to save the department after the death of the former chairman. The department was renamed "The Department of Animal Behavior". In 1946, Beach accepted an academic appointment at Yale University where he would spend the next decade. There his research interest became focused on the reproductive behavior of dogs which he continued for the rest of his life. Beach was elected to the United States National Academy of Sciences in 1949. In 1950, he accepted a position as a Sterling Professor of Psychology. A sabbatical at the Center for Advanced Study in the Behavioral Sciences at Stanford began in 1957–58. In 1958, Beach accepted a position as Professor of Psychology at the University of California, Berkeley. The research program on dogs that was initiated at Yale was expanded at Berkeley. Beach helped found the Field Station for Behavioral Research near the Berkeley campus. Beach was known for being an excellent mentor to graduate students while at Berkeley. Beach became professor emeritus in 1978, but still remained active in his work. Beach was awarded the APA award for Distinguished Teaching in Biopsychology in 1986.

Beach, along with anthropologist Clellan S. Ford, co-authored the book Patterns of Sexual Behavior (1951), considered a "classic" of its field. He was elected a Fellow of the American Academy of Arts and Sciences in 1953 and a member of the American Philosophical Society in 1961. He also authored an edited version, Human Sexuality in Four Perspectives, in 1977. Beach's second wife, Anna, died in 1971, and he thereafter married Noel Gaustad. In the days prior to his death, Beach continued his work from a hospital bed, reading scientific literature and giving advice about a paper on reproductive behavior to be presented at an Omaha conference on June 12, 1988. He died on June 15, 1988.

Beach's work in comparative psychology was expansive and influential. Beach studied behavior in rats, dogs, cats, quail, pigeons, dolphins, and hamsters. Beach was particularly interested in the role of endocrinology in behavior. He studied the effects of endocrines on behaviors through methods such as castration, isolation, brain legions, and hormone manipulation. Other behaviors that Beach was interested in include instinct behavior, maternal behavior, and menstruation.

== Legacy ==
Beach is remembered as a serious scholar and researcher, who believed that "increasing knowledge, in and of itself, is a justifiable way to spend your life." However, he was also known for his sense of fun, and humorously coined the term "Coolidge effect" based on an old joke about U.S. President Calvin Coolidge. Beach is also remembered for his colorful paper titles such as "The Snark was a Boojum" and "Locks and Beagles". Throughout his professional career, his greatest interests remained in the field of behaviour, remarking that "Man's greatest problem today is not to understand and exploit his physical environment, but to understand and govern his own conduct."

Beach was regarded as an excellent graduate student mentor; however, he vehemently opposed accepting any female graduate students into his lab early in his career. Beach did eventually change his mind about women and went on to mentor several successful female students.

At age sixty-five, Beach wrote the following autobiographical statement, which was preceded by a list of goals he wished to achieve:

Of course, I shall never accomplish all the goals just listed, but that is unimportant. What counts is to have aims, to be able to work hard toward them and to experience the satisfaction of at least believing that progress is being made. I do not want to cross the finish line of this race – not ever – but I do hope I will be able to keep running at my own pace until I drop out still moving in full stride. It's been one hell of a good race.

Beach is considered the principal founder of the field of behavioral endocrinology. Donald Dewsbery, writing for the National Academy of Sciences, called Beach "arguably the premier psychobiologist of his generation, influencing the development of psychobiology in numerous, diverse ways." The Society for Behavioral Neuroendocrinology has awarded the Frank A. Beach Young Investigator Award in Behavioral Neuroendocrinology annually since 1990.

== Recognition ==
- Chairman of the Department of Animal Behavior at the American Museum of Natural History, 1942
- Elected President of the American Psychological Association Division of Experimental Psychology, 1949
- Sterling Professor of Psychology at Yale University, 1950
- President of the Eastern Psychological Association, 1951
- William James Lecturer in Psychology at Harvard University, 1952
- Chair of the National Research Council Committee for the Study of Problems of Sex, 1957
- American Psychological Association Award for Distinguished Scientific Contributions, 1958
- President of the Western Psychological Association, 1968
- President of the International Academy of Sex Research, 1977
- Co-founded the journal Hormones and Behavior, 1979
- American Psychological Association Award for Distinguished Teaching in Biopsychology, 1986

== Patterns of Sexual Behavior ==
Whereas for much of history, well into the 20th century, homosexuality had been considered a mental disorder, Beach conceptualized homosexuality as a natural human phenomenon. In Patterns of Sexual Behavior, Beach and his co-author, Clellan S. Ford, outlined their study of sexual practices—including dating rituals, frequency of intercourse, and types of foreplay—across 76 distinct cultures, in 49 of which they reported finding acceptance of homosexual behavior.

Since publication, Patterns of Sexual Behavior has been cited by numerous scholars advocating against classifying homosexuality as mental disorder: 95 times in the first decade alone and an additional 226 times in the subsequent decade. In 1973, homosexuality was removed from the Diagnostic and Statistical Manual of Mental Disorders (DSM).

== Major publications ==
1937 - The Neural Basis of Innate Behavior, The Pedagogical Seminary and Journal of Genetic Psychology, 53:1 (Dissertation)

1948 - Hormones and Behavior: A Survey of Interrelationship between Endocrine Secretions and Patterns of Overt Response, Oxford: England (First Book)

1950 - The Snark was a Boojum, American Psychologist, 5:4

1952 - Patterns of Sexual Behavior, Oxford: England

1954 - Effects of Early Experience Upon the Behavior of Animals, Psychological Bulletin, 51:3

1955 - The De-scent of Instinct, Psychological Review, 62:6

1969 - Locks and Beagles, American Psychologist, 24:11

1971 - Hormonal Factors in the Ramstergig and Related Species, The Biopsychology of Development

1976 - Sexual Attractivity, Proceptivity, and Receptivity in Female Mammals, Hormones and Behavior, 7:1

1977 - Human Sexuality in Four Perspectives, Johns Hopkins University Press
