= Margaret McCarthy (academic) =

American neuroscientist and pharmacologist

- Born: Margaret Merryl McCarthy; August 21, 1958 (age 67)
- Education: University of Missouri; Rutgers University
- Known for: Neuroscience of sex differences
- Spouse: Gregory F. Ball
- Awards: Gill Transformative Investigator Award from the Gill Center for Biomolecular Science (2019)
- Scientific career
- Fields: Neuroscience; Pharmacology
- Institutions: University of Maryland School of Medicine
- Thesis: Steroid influences on GABAergic neurotransmission: A behavioral and biochemical approach (1989)
- Doctoral advisors: Harvey Feder; Carlos Beyer; Barry Komisaruk

Margaret M. "Peg" McCarthy (born August 21, 1958) is an American neuroscientist and pharmacologist. She is the James & Carolyn Frenkil Endowed Dean's Professor at the University of Maryland School of Medicine, where she is also Professor and Chair of the Department of Pharmacology. She is known for her research on the neuroscience of sex differences and their underlying mechanisms. In 2019, she received the Gill Transformative Investigator Award from the Gill Center for Biomolecular Science at Indiana University.

== Education ==
McCarthy received a Bachelor of Science and Master of Arts in Biology from the University of Missouri in 1981 and 1984. She then attended Rutgers University where she received a PhD. in Behavioral Neuroscience in 1989. Following her PhD., she completed a postdoctoral fellowship with Rockefeller University, where she studied Neurobiology. She completed a fellowship at the National Institutes of Health in Neurogenetics in 1993. The same year she joined the Department of Physiology at University of Maryland School of Medicine.

== Career and research ==
McCarthy's research focuses on understanding how the nervous system develops in healthy and diseased animals. McCarthy's lab discovered how male and female brains react differently to injury, which can influence their risk for neurological disorders. In 2019 she became the Director of the Program in Neuroscience at the University of Maryland School of Medicine.

McCarthy was the President of the Organization for the Study of Sex Differences from 2016 to 2018 and was on the advisory board of eNeuro in 2019. She is currently on the editorial board of Hormones and Behavior. She is a member of the Dana Alliance on Brain Research and a Fellow of the American Association for the Advancement of Science.

== Awards, honors, and affiliations ==
- Patricia Sokolove Outstanding Mentor Award by the Graduate Student Association (2003)
- Maryland's Top 100 Women (2009)
- Researcher of the Year, University of Maryland Baltimore (2016)
- Advisory Board Member, eNeuro, (2015–2021)
- Elected Member, National Academy of Medicine (2024)
