= Geoffrey Harris (neuroendocrinologist) =

British neuroendocrinologist (1913–1971)

Geoffrey W. Harris
- Born: 1913; United Kingdom
- Died: November 29, 1971 (aged 57–58); United Kingdom
- Education: Cambridge
- Known for: founder of neuroendocrinology
- Scientific career
- Fields: endocrinology, neuroendocrinology

Geoffrey Wingfield Harris (1913–1971) was a British physiologist and neuroendocrinologist. Often considered the "father of neuroendocrinology", he is best known for showing that the anterior pituitary is regulated by the hypothalamus via the hypophyseal portal system. His work established the principles for the 1977 Nobel Prize-winning discovery of hypothalamic hormones by Schally and Guillemin.

== Education and career ==
Harris received his undergraduate degree from Cambridge in 1936, and went on to attend medical training at St. Mary's Hospital in London until 1939. In 1940, he became a demonstrator of Anatomy at Cambridge, and helped train physicians for the war effort. He earned his M.D. from Cambridge in 1944 with a thesis on electrophysiological stimulation of posterior pituitary hormone release. In 1952, he became a professor at the Institute of Psychiatry at the University of London, where he was when elected into the Royal Society. In 1962, he moved to Oxford University, where he began the Medical Research Council Neuroendocrinology Unit. In 1970, Harris was named an honorary member of the American Association for Anatomy. He was awarded the Dale Medal from the British Endocrinological Society in 1971.

== Research ==
In the late 1940s, Harris' early research showed the hypothalamus, but not the pituitary directly, could be electrically stimulated and led to ovulation in rabbits. These experiments led to his hypothesis that the anterior pituitary gland is regulated in a "neurohumoral" manner through the blood vessels between the hypothalamus and the pituitary, the hypophyseal portal system. In collaboration with Dora Jacobsohn, he established that blood flows from the hypothalamus to the pituitary through these vessels, and that vascular access to the median eminence is required for pituitary stimulation. He also showed that the brain was the site of negative feedback for gonadal sex steroids. Harris was part of the scientific race to characterize the "hypothalamic releasing factors" released into the median eminence, but lacked the funding of competing labs and preferred bioassays to faster immunoassays. Andrew Schally and Roger Guillemin ultimately shared the Nobel Prize for the structure and function of GnRH in 1977, after Harris' death in 1971.
