= Dora Jacobsohn =

German-Swedish physiologist and endocrinologist (1908–1983)

Dora E. Jacobsohn
- Born: Dora Elisabeth Jacobsohn; March 1, 1908; Berlin, Germany
- Died: October 31, 1983 (aged 75); Lund, Sweden
- Scientific career
- Fields: endocrinology, neuroendocrinology

Dora Elisabeth Jacobsohn (1908–1983) was a German-Swedish physiologist and endocrinologist. Considered one of the early pioneers of the field of neuroendocrinology, she is best known for her work with Geoffrey Harris showing that the anterior pituitary gland is controlled by the hypothalamus via the hypophyseal portal system.

== Biography ==
Jacobsohn was born in Berlin in 1908. She earned her M.D. in Germany in 1933, but she was not allowed to practice medicine in Germany because she was Jewish. Fleeing Nazi Germany, Jacobsohn moved to Sweden in 1934, where she had family. There, she met Axel Westman at the Uppsala University Hospital, who permitted her to observe and assist in his endocrinological research on ovulation and reproduction in hypophysectomized (pituitary removed) animals. Although Jacobsohn was not permitted to do research as she was a foreigner without a Swedish degree, she worked with Westman at Lund University and ran clinical hormone assays for the hospital. Nonetheless, she published over 22 research papers during this 10 year collaboration. In 1944, she gained Swedish citizenship and in 1948, a Swedish medical degree, with a thesis on mammary gland development. This allowed her to finally become a professor at Lund University. In 1952, the Royal Physiographic Society in Lund changed their rules to accept women, and she was elected a society Fellow. In 1964, she was promoted to Director of Experimental Endocrinology at Lund University.

Jacobsohn never married, and died in 1983 after a nearly year-long coma due to a traffic accident.

== Research contributions ==
In collaboration with Geoffrey Harris at Cambridge, Jacobsohn performed a series of elegant transplantation experiments, showing that pituitary grafts could only stimulate ovulation when in connection with the hypothalamus / mid brain, not the temporal lobe or other parts of the body. This first showed that the anterior pituitary must be controlled by, and in contact with, the brain via the hypothalamus. Further, they showed that the blood vessels (via the hypophyseal portal system), rather than nervous stimulation, was necessary for stimulating the anterior pituitary. This work founded the brain's role in hormonal regulation, helping to establish the field of neuroendocrinology.

She also did work showing that the posterior pituitary is required for milk ejection, later discovered to be mediated by the hormone oxytocin. Later in her career, she studied the effects of androgens and sex steroids on sexual development in rodents.
