= Robert L. Ketter =

American academic administrator (1929–1989)

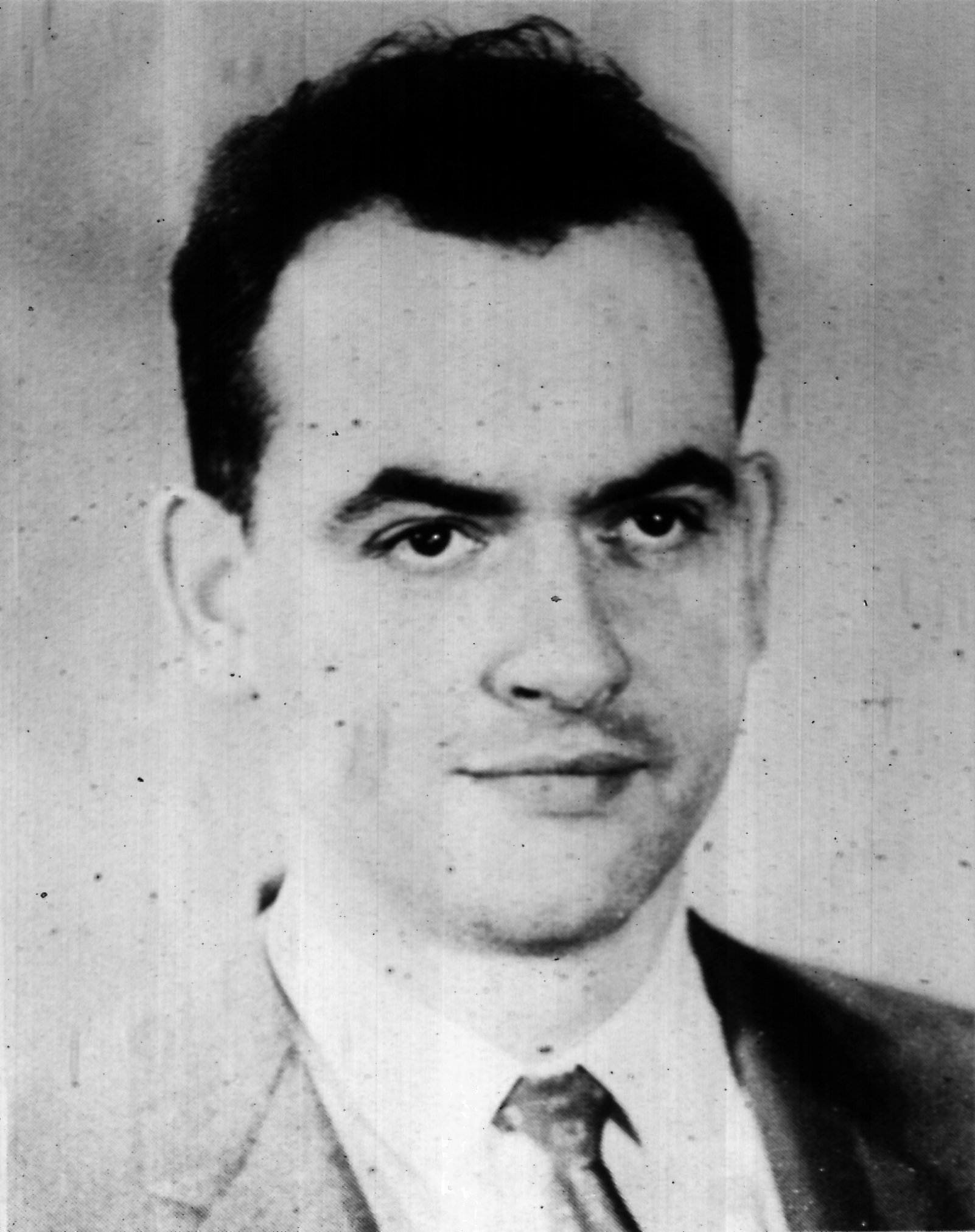
- Ketter in 1967

11th President of the University at Buffalo
- In office 1970–1982
- Preceded by: Martin Meyerson
- Succeeded by: Steven Sample

Robert L. Ketter (1929–1989) was an authority on earthquake engineering research and a former president of the State University of New York at Buffalo (UB).

A graduate of Lehigh University, Ketter went to the University of Buffalo to inaugurate and head the school's Department of Civil Engineering in 1958. He went on to become the dean of UB's College of Engineering and Applied Sciences (CEAS) and became university president in 1970, after years of student unrest associated with the Vietnam War closed the campus during the spring semester.

Ketter designed the Buffalo & Erie County Public Library building and wrote several engineering texts while at UB. In 1971, Ketter announced the termination of intercollegiate football at UB due to "insufficient financial support" and losses in funds.

In 1981, Ketter retired as UB president and took a one-year sabbatical before returning to UB's CEAS as a professor of engineering and applied sciences. Ketter received a 1986 National Science Foundation grant worth $25 million. The grant allowed for the construction of the National Center for Earthquake Engineering Research (NCEER), the institute which preceded the Multidisciplinary Center for Earthquake Engineering Research (MCEER). Ketter received several honorary degrees, including doctorates in engineering from Lehigh University in 1986 and in science from Kyoungpook University in South Korea in 1973.

Ketter died on April 18, 1989. Robert L. Ketter Hall, on the UB Amherst campus, is named in his honor, and houses both the Department of Civil, Structural and Environmental Engineering and the Structural Engineering and Earthquake Simulation Laboratory (SEESL).

Academic offices
Preceded by Martin Meyerson	11th President of the University at Buffalo; 1970-1982	Succeeded by Steven Sample
