= Steven Sample =

American university president (1940–2016)

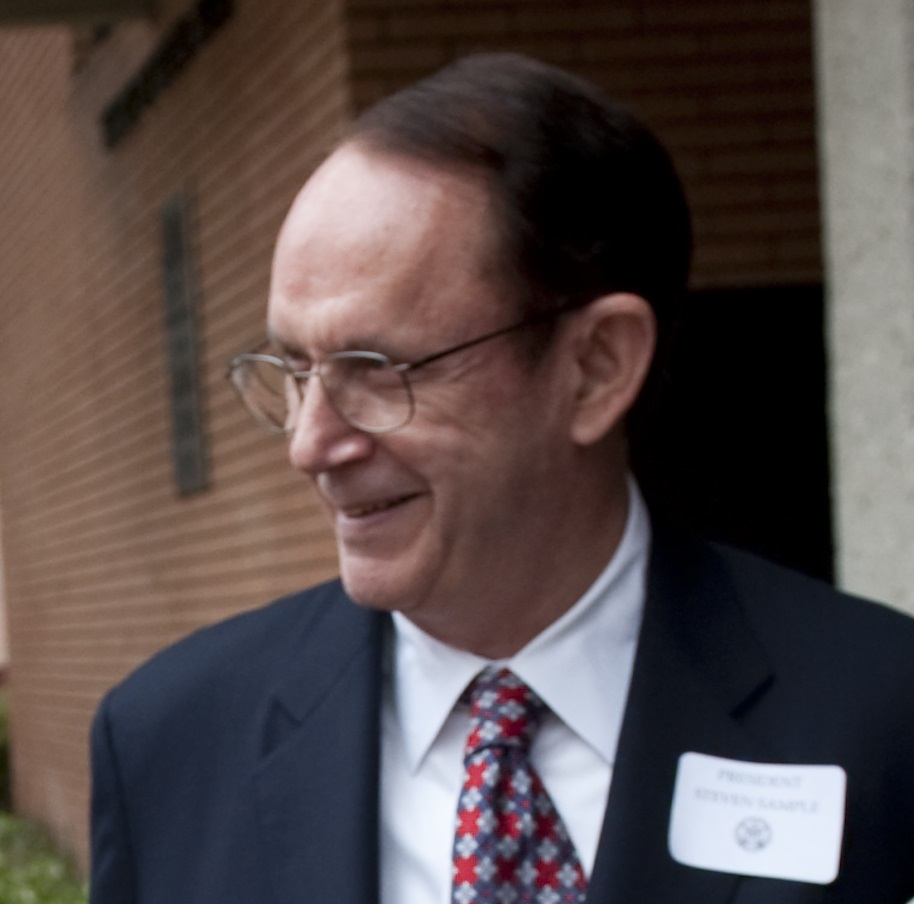
- Sample in 2010

10th President of the University of Southern California
- In office 1991–2010
- Preceded by: James Zumberge
- Succeeded by: C.L. Max Nikias

12th President of the University at Buffalo
- In office 1982–1991
- Preceded by: Robert L. Ketter
- Succeeded by: William R. Greiner

Personal details
- Born: Steven Browning Sample; November 29, 1940 St. Louis, Missouri, U.S.
- Died: March 29, 2016 (aged 75)
- Education: University of Illinois at Urbana-Champaign
- Profession: Electrical engineering, Higher education, Academic administration

Steven Browning Sample (November 29, 1940 – March 29, 2016) was the 10th president of the University of Southern California (USC). He became president in 1991 and was succeeded by C. L. Max Nikias on August 3, 2010. Prior to his presidency at USC, Sample was the 12th president of the University at Buffalo (UB) in the State University of New York (SUNY) system from 1982 to 1991. He was succeeded at UB by Bill Greiner.

== Education ==
Sample was born on November 29, 1940 and grew up in the Belden Hill neighborhood of Wilton, Connecticut, and received a scholarship to attend the University of Illinois to study engineering. Sample held B.S., M.S., and Ph.D. degrees in electrical engineering from the University of Illinois at Urbana-Champaign, where he was initiated as a member of the Beta Theta Pi fraternity.

== Career ==
=== University at Buffalo presidency ===
Sample was president of the University at Buffalo from 1982 to 1991, and was succeeded by Bill Greiner. While president, he gained fame for upgrading the long-languishing sports program, and for guiding the university into being a major research institution. Accordingly, the university's academic functions were consolidated under the office of the provost, in a major change from prior tradition.

==== Honors ====
In 2004, Sample was honored by UB with the Charles P. Norton Medal, the highest honor given by the university. Also in 2004, a scholarship fund was established in Sample's honor to go toward funding four years for an undergraduate who is a student in the Engineering and Applied Sciences Department, as well as being in the University Honors Program.

Regarding the establishment of a scholarship fund in his honor, Sample is quoted in a statement, included in an article in the June 2, 2004, edition of The Buffalo News by Stephen Watson, stating, "I am proud of the fact that, through this endowed scholarship, my name will be permanently linked with the University of Buffalo, the School of Engineering and Applied Sciences and the honors program."

=== University of Southern California presidency ===
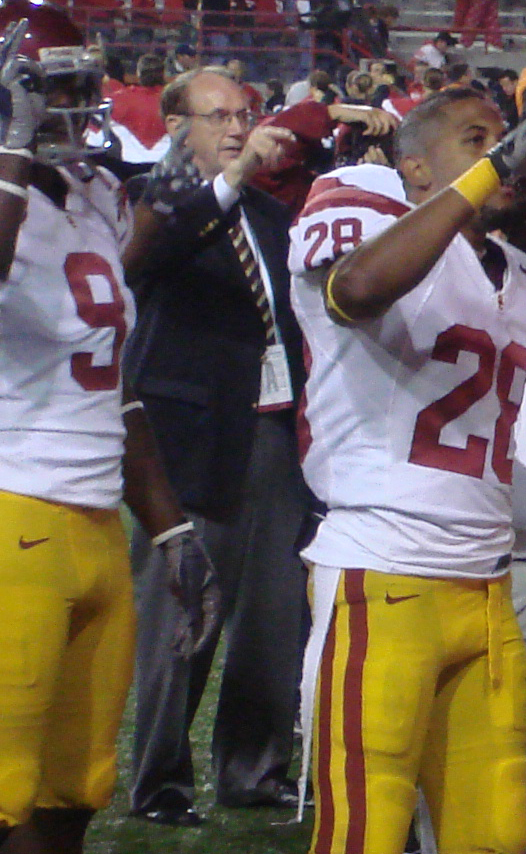
Sample with the 2007 USC Trojans football team, celebrating a victory

Under Sample's leadership, USC became world-renowned in the fields of communication and multimedia technologies, received national acclaim for its innovative community partnerships, and improved its status as one of the nation's leading research universities. In 1999, USC was ranked #41 among universities in the United States by U.S. News & World Report. In 2010, the final year of Sample's term, USC was ranked #26 in the same listing (USC is now ranked #23). In 2008, his own salary was $1.9 million.

USC announced on November 1, 2009, that Sample would step down as its president in August 2010. He explained that he wanted to see "fresh leadership" take charge. After stepping down as President, and following a one-year sabbatical, Sample taught a course at USC with Warren Bennis.

On August 3, 2010, C.L. Max Nikias became the 11th president of the university.

==== Fundraising ====
Sample's fundraising initiatives raised more than $430 million for sponsored research. He led two strategic planning processes to improve the university on the whole. During his term, the university also conducted the second most successful fundraising campaign in the history of higher education, raising nearly $3 billion. These donations included major contributions of $112.5 million from Alfred Mann to establish the Mann Institute of Biomedical Engineering, $120 million from Ambassador Walter Annenberg to create the Annenberg Center for Communication, $100 million from the Annenberg Foundation, and a $110 million from the W. M. Keck Foundation for the Keck School of Medicine. More recently, Sample has overseen the $175 million gift from George Lucas to the School of Cinematic Arts.

==== Construction projects ====
He oversaw the construction of a number of important structures at USC. These included the Leavey Library, Popovich Hall, the International Residential College at Parkside, the Arts and Humanities Residential College at Parkside, and Ronald Tutor Hall. Additional construction projects included the Galen Center, the George Lucas Building at the University Park Campus, the Ronald Tutor Campus Center, and the University Hospital at the Health Sciences Campus.

==== Research ====
Sample is the author of numerous journal articles and published papers in science and engineering and in higher education. His patents for digital appliance controls, particularly touch pads on microwave ovens, have been licensed to practically every major manufacturer of appliances in the world. Over 300 million home appliances have been built using his inventions.

==== Teaching ====
Sample had a passion for teaching and education at USC. He taught several classes to students in different fields and different class levels. Most recently, he taught "The Art and Adventure of Leadership" with Warren Bennis.

== Books ==
In 2002, Sample published a book titled The Contrarian's Guide to Leadership. It explains his personal leadership philosophy and provides advice to readers. More specifically, it details his style of leadership in the context of USC's rise as an institution in his decade as president.

== Personal life ==
In 2001, Sample was diagnosed with Parkinson's disease, but said he would not let it affect his duties as president. Sample was a resident of San Marino, California. On March 29, 2016, Sample died at the age of 75.

Academic offices
Preceded by James H. Zumberge	10th President of the University of Southern California; 1991-2010	Succeeded by C. L. Max Nikias
Preceded by Robert L. Ketter	12th President of the University at Buffalo; 1982–1991	Succeeded by William R. Greiner
