= Walter Lee Gaines =

American dairy scientist

Walter Lee Gaines (17 March 1881 – 20 November 1950) was a pioneer of dairy science and a professor of milk production at the University of Illinois. He studied factors affecting hormonal injections and their induction of milk production. In 1915 he used a pituitary gland extract from goats to demonstrate the effect, and it was later identified that the hormone was oxytocin. He noted that anaesthetic prevented this hormone from being effective and Gaines was among the first to suggest the idea of a neuroendocrine reflex involving the production of the substance in response to suckling. He was also thus a pioneer of neuroendocrinology.

Gaines was born in Crete, Illinois and went to the University of Illinois, receiving a BS (1908) and an MS (1910) before working towards and obtaining his PhD at the University of Chicago on the physiology of lactation. His 1915 thesis work on the induction of milk flow by hormones through injections and the observation that this induction is prevented by anaesthesia made him suggest a connection between neural stimulation of the endocrine system. He became a professor of milk production in 1919 and was involved in dairy research including studies on the effect of hormone, milk constitution and devised an approach to standardization of the energy content in milk.

He was married to the former Alta Hooper, a pioneer of female newspaper journalists for the Bloomington-Normal (IL) Pantagraph. They had two sons: John (1915-1999), a financial executive; and Robert, an executive for Ford and General Motors who died in the 1987 Northwest Airlines Flight 255 airliner crash.
