= Differential tuition =

Tiered tuition for students

Differential tuition or tiered tuition is an amount charged on top of base tuition to support additional services and programming for students at a particular academic institution. Researchers found 60 percent of public research universities were charging students different prices based primarily on their major and their year in college, with those differences increasing tuition by up to 40 percent.

== Degree programs ==
Differential tuition may be charged to students according to the specific courses they take, or only to students enrolled in certain programs. Program-specific differential tuitions are usually charged for programs that have high operating costs such as the health sciences and engineering, or high student demand such as business. Some states like Kentucky and Florida have proposed applying differential tuition to arts and humanities degree programs perceived as having less value in the workforce.

== Student standing ==
Differential tuition can be charged to all students enrolled at a particular institution, or to a particular category of students such as all undergraduates. Educational institutions may have exemptions for freshman students or for the earliest credit hours completed toward a degree program up to a specified number, such as the 60 hours often used to differentiate upperclassmen.
