= Acta Ethologica =

acta ethologica
- Discipline: Ethology
- Language: English
- Edited by: Peter K. McGregor

Publication details
- History: 1998–present
- Publisher: Springer Nature
- Frequency: Triannually
- Impact factor: 1.231 (2020)

Standard abbreviations
- ISO 4: Acta Ethol.

Indexing
- ISSN: 0873-9749 (print); 1437-9546 (web)
- OCLC no.: 223806947

Links
- Journal homepage; Online archive

acta ethologica is a triannual peer-reviewed scientific journal established in 1998. The journal covers all aspects of the behavioural biology of humans and other animals, including behavioural ecology, evolution of behaviour, sociobiology, ethology, behavioural physiology, and population biology.

According to SCImago Journal Rank (SJR), the journal h-index is 32, ranking it to Q2 in Animal Science and Zoology and Q3 in Ecology, Evolution, Behavior and Systematics.

== Abstracting and indexing ==
The journal is abstracted and indexed in:

- Science Citation Index Expanded
- Scopus
- PsycINFO
- Biological Abstracts
- BIOSIS Previews
- Current Contents/Agriculture, Biology & Environmental Sciences
- Elsevier Biobase
- EMBiology
- The Zoological Record

According to the Journal Citation Reports, the journal has a 2020 impact factor of 1.231.
