= Clellan S. Ford =

American anthropologist (1909–1972)

- Born: 27 July 1909; Worcester, Massachusetts
- Died: 4 November 1972 (aged 63); New Haven, Connecticut
- Education: Yale University
- Known for: Professor of Anthropology at Yale University; co-author of Patterns of Sexual Behavior (1951)
- Scientific career
- Fields: Anthropology

Clellan Stearns Ford (27 July 1909 – 4 November 1972) was an American anthropologist, best known as Professor of Anthropology at Yale University, and as co-author of the 1951 book Patterns of Sexual Behavior.

== Biography ==
Clellan Ford was born on July 27, 1909, in Worcester, Massachusetts. He was educated at Yale University, where he received the Ph.D. in chemistry in 1931, and a Ph.D. in sociology in 1935. In 1935, Ford spent a year in the Fiji Islands conducting ethnographic field research. The following year, he joined the Institute of Human Relations at Yale, where he co-founded the Cross-Cultural Survey. In 1940, the same year he was appointed Assistant Professor of Yale's anthropology department, he spent time studying the Kwakiutl Indians of British Columbia, and initiated a comparative study of human reproduction. During World War II, Ford received a lieutenant's commission in the U.S. Naval Reserve, and helped prepare military handbooks on the Pacific islands occupied by Japanese forces. Ford returned to Yale in 1946 as associate professor of anthropology. As director of the Cross-Cultural Survey, he expanded the organization and renamed it the Human Relations Area Files. In 1951, along with Frank Beach, Ford published Patterns of Sexual Behavior, which explored the sexual behavior of humans and animals. The work is considered a "classic" of its field. Ford died from cancer in New Haven, Connecticut, on November 4, 1972.

== See also ==
- Patterns of Sexual Behavior
