= Barney A. Schlinger =

American Ornithologist and neuroendocrinologist

Barnett "Barney" A. Schlinger is Professor of Integrative Biology & Physiology and of Ecology & Evolutionary Biology at the University of California, Los Angeles (UCLA).

== Career ==
Upon receipt of his Ph.D. in 1988, he began a post-doctoral fellowship in the Department of Psychology at UCLA, a position he held for 3 years before being appointed an Assistant Research Psychologist in 1991. In 1993 he was appointed as assistant professor in the Department of Physiological Science at UCLA. That department later changed its name to Integrative Biology and Physiology (IBP). Schlinger was promoted to Full Professor in 2002. He has been a member of the Laboratory of Neuroendocrinology of the UCLA Brain Research Institute since 1988.

Schlinger was appointed Chair of the IBP department in 2009, a position he held for 9 years. In 2022 he was appointed Associate Dean for Academic Personnel of the Life Sciences Division at UCLA.

Outside of UCLA, and upon receipt of an Alexander von Humboldt Research Award for Senior U.S. Scientist, Schlinger was a Visiting Scientist at the Max Planck Institute for Ornithology in Seewiesen, Germany. He has been a Research Associate of the Smithsonian Tropical Research Institute (STRI) in Panama. He served as President of the Society for Behavioral Neuroendocrinology (as well as President-elect and Immediate Past President) from 2017 to 2023.

== Research work ==
=== Estrogen Synthesis in Brain ===
Schlinger has maintained a long interest in the actions of steroids on the central nervous system. Largely examining avian models, he has explored neuroestrogen synthesis with a focus on the enzyme aromatase that catalyzes the conversion of androgens into estrogens. Over the years, his work has demonstrated expression and activity of this enzyme in brain of diverse species and with diverse functions. He has documented a role for neuroestrogens in neuronal development and proliferation, neural repair and protection, sexual and aggressive behaviors, learning and memory, and auditory processing. His work demonstrates estrogen synthesis at the synapse with post-synaptic actions, or synaptocrinology.

=== Neurosteroidogenesis ===
Schlinger has found evidence, especially in the songbird brain, that hormonal steroids could be synthesized directly in the brain itself. Members of his lab have found expression and, in many cases, activity of enzymes and transporters required for steroid synthesis from cholesterol. His research over the years has not only added considerable evidence to support the concept of functional neurosteroidogenesis but also extended our appreciation of how neurosteroids control natural animal neural function and behavior.

=== Physiology of Elaborate Animal Courtship ===
Schlinger has developed an animal model, the golden-collared manakin (Manacus vitellinus) of Panama, for investigating the hormonal, neural, and muscular control of vertebrate behavior. This work spans tropical field behavioral ecology, organ-level physiology, and molecular and cellular biology. The bird is a useful model because the males perform a physically complex courtship display. As a suboscine songbird, its behavior and neurohormonal basis can be compared directly to the well-studied group of oscine songbirds. His studies of the courtship displays of male Manacus species have identified specializations in skeletal and muscle anatomy, as well as in endocrine, neural, and muscle physiology. Sequencing of the manakin genome, together with efforts to support genomic sequencing of other manakin species, has made these birds a clade used for molecular genetic approaches to studying the evolution and development of social systems, behavior, and the physiology underlying behavior.

== Selected publications ==
- London, S.E., Monks, A., Wade, J., and Schlinger, B.A.. 2006. Widespread capacity for steroid synthesis within the avian brain and song system. Endocrinology 147: 5975–5987.
- Fuxjager, M., Longpre, K., Chew, J., Fusani, L., and Schlinger, B.A.. 2013. Peripheral androgen receptors sustain the acrobatics and fine motor skill of elaborate male courtship. Endocrinology 154: 3168–3177.
- Fuxjager, M.J., Lee, J.H., Chan, T-M, Bahn, J.H., Chew, J.G., Xiao, X. and Schlinger, B.A.. 2016. Hormones, Genes, and Athleticism: Effect of Androgens on the Avian, Muscular Transcriptome. Molecular Endocrinology 30: 254–71.
- Fuxjager, M.J., Miller Ligon, R., Fusani, L., Goller, F., Trost, L., Ter Maat, A., Gahr, M., Chiver, I., Chew, J and Schlinger, B.A.. 2017. Neuromuscular mechanisms of an elaborate wing display in the golden-collared manakin (Manacus vitellinus). Journal of Experimental Biology 220: 4681–4688.
- Schlinger, B.A. and I. Chiver. 2021. Behavioral Sex Differences and Hormonal Control in a Bird with an Elaborate Courtship Display. Integrative and. Comparative. Biology 61:1319-1328.

=== Book ===
- Schlinger, Barney A. (5 September 2023). The Wingsnappers: Lessons from an Exuberant Tropical Bird. Yale University Press.
