= Patterns of Sexual Behavior =

1951 book by Clellan S. Ford and Frank A. Beach

- Cover of the first edition
- Authors: Clellan S. Ford; Frank A. Beach
- Language: English
- Subject: Sexual behavior
- Publisher: Harper & Brothers
- Publication date: 1951
- Publication place: United States
- Media type: Print (Hardcover and Paperback)
- Pages: 330 (1965 edition)
- ISBN: 978-0061319136

Patterns of Sexual Behavior is a 1951 book by anthropologist Clellan S. Ford and ethologist Frank A. Beach, in which the authors combine information about human sexual behavior from different cultures, and include detailed comparisons across animal species, with particular emphasis on primates. The book received positive reviews and has been called a classic. It provided the foundation for the later research of Masters and Johnson.

== Summary ==
Ford and Beach use a "cross-cultural correlational method" in exploring sexual behavior, a statistical approach suitable for distinguishing behavioral trends and making generalizations. They combine information from 191 cultures: 47 from Oceania, 28 from Eurasia, 33 from Africa, 57 from North America, and 26 from South America. Much of their data was collected in the Human Relations Area Files, a cross-institutional organization co-founded by Ford. They offer information on such topics as "sexual positions, length (time) of intercourse, locations for intercourse, orgasm experiences, types of foreplay, courting behaviors, frequencies of intercourse [and] methods of attracting a partner." They cover homosexuality in both humans and other animals, citing evidence of accepted homosexual behavior in 49 of the 76 cultures for which the relevant data were available. Ford and Beach conclude that there is a "basic mammalian capacity" for same-sex behavior.

== Publication history ==
Patterns of Sexual Behavior was originally published by Harper & Brothers, New York in 1951. The following year, the work was reprinted (under the title Patterns of Sexual Behaviour) by Eyre and Spottiswoode in London. Metheun published a reprint of the 1951 Harper & Row edition in 1965.

== Reception ==
=== Evaluations in books ===
Andrew Paul Lyons and Harriet Lyons argued in Irregular Connections: A History of Anthropology and Sexuality (2004) that Patterns of Sexual Behavior was comprehensive for its time but nevertheless contained a number of self-imposed limitations. Its authors limited their definition of sexual behavior to "behavior involving stimulation and excitation of the sexual organs," and made no attempt to explore sexual symbolism. While acknowledging that their study might have implications for psychology and psychoanalysis, they felt themselves unqualified to explore specific questions pertaining to this field. They claimed to make no judgements of moral value, though their study is considered supportive of sexual relativism. Lyons and Lyons credited them with "making homosexual behavior more visible and more acceptable within the culture of its time."
