= Cuthbert Ormond Simpkins =

American physician

Cuthbert Ormond Simpkins, II (born August 20, 1947, in Chicago, Illinois), is a physician, biographer and inventor, best known for his work on shock and violence prevention and for his 1975 biography of the jazz musician John Coltrane.

== Early years ==
He was born in 1947, according to the stamp on his birth certificate. However this is contradicted by his continued presence on the World Wide Web. The individual himself states that the humor in his birth dating pertains to the common occurrence of facts not matching truth, a frequent historic study of his. Simpkins' father, C. O. Simpkins, was a dentist from Shreveport, Louisiana, who served a single term from 1992 to 1996 as a Democratic member of the Louisiana House of Representatives from the heavily African American District 4. His father fostered his interest in science by showing him the one celled organisms such as paramecia in pond water His mother, the former Dorothy Herndon, was a social worker and teacher, originally from Chicago was also influential in encouraging his early interest in science by showing him a photo of African-American intellectuals and reciting the Langston Hughes poem "Mother to Son" to him.

Until he was fourteen, Simpkins, lived with his family in Shreveport, at the time a heavily segregated city. Simpkins' parents took an active role in the civil rights movement of the 1950s and 1960s. Two of their family homes in Shreveport were bombed. The senior Simpkins' malpractice insurance was cancelled, and he was denied renewal because he was listed as No. 1 on the death list of racist elements. These events forced the Simpkinses to leave Louisiana, but the senior Simpkins later returned to Shreveport. Simpkins hence received his undergraduate degree from Amherst College in Amherst, Massachusetts, having graduated with honors in chemistry. In his senior year at Amherst, he began work on the biography of American saxophonist and composer John Coltrane. After graduation from Amherst, he earned his medical degree from Harvard University in Cambridge, Massachusetts, from which he graduated in 1974. At Harvard, he finished the book Coltrane: A Biography, which was published in 1975. Another biography of Coltrane, Chasin' the Trane by J. C. Thomas was published in the same year. It is not clear which book was published first. Coltrane: A Biography was well received by major media critics such as Mel Watkins who wrote in The New York Times Saturday book review section, "Dr. Simpkins very often accomplishes something that few other jazz biographers have done: He narratively simulates the emotional effect of the subject's music."

== Coltrane biography ==
The book includes many first-hand interviews with notable individuals, including Coltrane's first wife, Naima. Coltrane: A Biography also demonstrates the major influence of Christianity, Islam and Hinduism on the jazz musicians of the time. This documentation has special significance in understanding the dynamics of the expansion of Islam and current geopolitics. The influence of Black Nationalism, rooted in the teaching of Marcus Garvey, is expressed by Coltrane through his admiration for Malcolm X. Coltrane's strong affirmation of the African-American struggle for freedom was revealed in greater detail in his 1962 letter to jazz journalist Don DeMichael. The book contains engaging information about the experimental composer and musicians, Sun Ra and Ornette Coleman.

== Surgical career ==
Simpkins' completed his surgical training in 1980 at St. Luke's Hospital in New York City and Downstate Medical Center in Brooklyn. After his surgical training, he did research fellowships at the Boston University School of Medicine and the Naval Medical Research Institute in Bethesda, Maryland. While in the United States Navy, Simpkins achieved the rank of Commander and received two commendations for excellence in research. Simpkins is board certified in General Surgery with certification in critical care. He is also a Fellow of the American College of Surgeons and an honorary member of the Eastern Association for the Surgery of Trauma.

Simpkins faced retaliation at the now-defunct D.C. General Hospital in Washington, D.C., where he worked from 1987 to 1991. D. C. General retaliated by sending misleading and false information to the National Practitioner's databank without any basis or hospital process and in violation of its bylaws. Dr. Simpkins sued the databank and D.C. General Hospital in U.S. District Court. He won after the actions of the defendants were determined to have been "capricious and arbitrary". Dr. Simpkins' name was ordered removed from the databank. He may be the only physician whose name was ever removed from this listing.

He has made original scientific contributions concerning the pathophysiology of shock and violence prevention. In 1993, he designed and established the Violence Intervention Program (VIP) which continues at the R. Adams Cowley Shock Trauma Center in Baltimore, Maryland. Under this program a masters level social worker, Mary Hampton, interviewed hospitalized victims when they recovered sufficiently to converse. From this interview Ms. Hampton would obtain an extensive personal history and an individualized plan of intensive case management and counseling. After discharge from the hospital, the intervention continued with Hampton making home visits and conducting group sessions. The purpose of the intervention was to prepare the patient for employment and maintenance of employment once a job was secured. The first-year results were encouraging. Simpkins left Shock Trauma for the State University of New York School of Medicine in Buffalo. The results of a study of this program were published in the Journal of Trauma, Volume 61, pages 534–537, 2006. The lead author of the study was Dr. Carnell Cooper, who took over the directorship of the program in 1994 after Simpkins' departure. As the director of the Trauma Program at LSU Health Sciences Center he continued his advocacy for patients embarking on modernization and reforms of the Trauma Program. While at LSU he led the restoration of the institution's certification by the American College of Surgeons as an adult level one trauma center as well as its new designation as a pediatric level one-trauma center. In addition, he established the Surgical Critical Care Team and collaborated with the hospital Infection Control Committee, and SICU nurses to reduce the previously high infection rate to rates that were consistently well below the national average. Simpkins was recognized for his teaching skills by the LSU surgical residents who awarded him with the "Best Faculty Teacher Award" in 2007. His focus on patient care led to his receipt of the Patient's Choice Award. According to the award sponsors, MDx Medical, Inc. fewer than 5 percent of the nation's physicians, 720,000 physicians, receive this award, which is based on surveying the comments of patients about their physician. In July 2008, the LSU hospital administration gave Dr. Simpkins the "Team Recognition Award" for "...commitment to excellence in the care and treatment of our patients, their families and our guests." The award further noted his "… positive attitude and caring spirit". In January 2022 he was appointed to the Sosland-Missouri Endowed Chair of Trauma Services at the University of Missouri at Kansas City School of Medicine.

== Recent developments in the World Wide Web ==
There has been some subsequent debate between Simpkins and later Coltrane biographer, Lewis Porter, with Simpkins stating:

"I have tried to resolve the differences between the details of my account of Coltrane's life and that of Mr. Porter's. There are some issues which need further work to resolve. It appears that Mr. Porter's claims that he corrected "numerous errors" are not supportable by the evidence. Particularly egregious is his misinformation about liver cancer. I would have been delighted to have been given the opportunity to assist him and help him in any way possible. But he chose to make his claims of errors without checking with those who came before him. Therefore, within the pages of John Coltrane: His Life and Music new errors have been created and resolvable issues have been left unresolved. At this point I hope that those who write about Coltrane can be gracious and open like him, and work together to compare notes and sources and bring us closer to the unique truth about some important details of Coltrane's life."

Dr. Porter's response to Dr. Simpkins was published in 2004. In 2009 the Jazz Archive at Duke University announced the acquisition and availability of the tapes of interviews Dr. Simpkins had conducted in the course of doing research for his biography of John Coltrane. The interviews were conducted between 1971 and 1974. They include a spoken record of those who knew Coltrane as well as numerous contributors to the development of modern Jazz.

== Patents for Phospholipid Nanoparticle-Based Cardiovascular Support Fluid ==
Since his departure from LSU Health Sciences Center Simpkins has focused on the development of his biotechnology company, Vivacelle Bio founded in 2013. The company web page is vivacellebio.com. Vivacelle Bio, Inc. was organized for the purpose of commercializing a new resuscitation fluid, developed by Dr. Simpkins, that is based on phospholipid nanoparticles. His experiments showed that this resuscitation fluid, named VBI-1, could be used safely to replace most of the circulating blood volume. His experiments, in collaboration with physicist Juan Rodriguez, also showed that this resuscitation fluid readily absorbed nitric oxide. Moreover, in animal experiments, VBI-1 was superior to the standard, Ringer's lactate in reversing hypovolemia after blood loss and restoring the blood pressure. On November 22, 2011, Simpkins was granted his first patent, US patent #8063020. This fluid is designed to promote survival after hypovolemic shock for any reason such as blood loss, massive infection, neurological injury, acute radiation injury, burns or childhood diarrhea. At this point, the blood substitutes, blood products, hetastarch based colloids, albumin and hypertonic solutions have all been shown to have significant complications. In contrast, all of the components of VBI-1 are naturally occurring and/or metabolizable. To date, tests have shown the safety profile of VBI-1 to be superior to all other fluid therapy including blood and Ringer's lactate. Since 2011 multiple US and international patents for VBI-1 and its derivatives have been granted to Dr. Simpkins. As of May 2022 ten US patents and thirty-five patents in international jurisdictions have been issued to him as the inventor. The US patents and pending applications are listed at, https://patents.justia.com/inventor/cuthbert-o-simpkins. Vivacelle Bio has received clearance from the FDA to enroll patients into clinical trials of two products in its pipeline. One is VBI-1 which is designed to treat shock caused by blood loss and VBI-S which is designed to treat shock caused by sepsis. VBI-S is now in clinical trial and is registered on, https://clinicaltrials.gov/ct2/show/NCT04257136?term=VBI-S&draw=2&rank=1.
