= Behavioral endocrinology =

Field of biology

Behavioral endocrinology is a branch of endocrinology that studies the Neuroendocrine system and its effects on behavior. Behavioral endocrinology studies the biological mechanisms that produce behaviors, this gives insight into the evolutionary past. The field has roots in ethology, endocrinology and psychology.

== The neuroendocrine system ==
The neuroendocrine system is an integrated system composed of neurons, glands and non-endocrine tissues, and the hormones and neurochemicals they produce and receive collectively regulate physiological or behavioral state.

=== Hypothalamus ===
The hypothalamus is a distinct part of the brain that is made up of neurons and its main purpose is to maintain homeostasis. The hypothalamus also plays an important part in survival of the individual by integrating the interactions between hormonal and behavioral processes, such as, eating behavior and aggressive behavior.

=== Pituitary gland ===
The pituitary gland located in the brain is a major system in neuroendocrine system because the secretion of hormones from the anterior pituitary is directly regulated by the central nervous system.

== Neuroendocrine regulation of behavior ==
Social behavior, reproductive behavior, moods, feelings, attitudes, development and survival are affected by the neuroendocrine system and studied in the field of behavioral endocrinology. One perspective views hormones as biological “coordinators”, responding to various “inputs” by appropriately regulating the related “outputs”. For example, androgens such as testosterone, estradiol and progesterone modulate the investment of resources spent toward mating or survival. From this perspective, the androgens respond to several relevant inputs (the presence of potential mates, the amount of food or fat available, stress, illness, etc,) and modulates physiology and behavior accordingly (modulating metabolic rate and fat storage, courtship behavior, parental behavior, etc.)

=== Adrenal Hormones ===
==== Cortisol ====
See the Cortisol: Memory and Stress sections for more information on how cortisol has been found to affect behavior.

==== Adrenaline ====
See the Adrenaline: Emotional response and Memory sections for more information on how adrenaline affects behavior.

=== Peptide Hormones ===
==== Oxytocin ====
Oxytocin is a peptide that has been associated with social behavior, specifically regarding areas like trust, empathy, and other affirmative behaviors.

==== Vassopressin ====
Vassopressin (or AVP) has physiological functions regulating water retention and blood pressure, as well as social behavior.

=== Sex Steroids ===
==== Testosterone ====
Testosterone is secreted by the testicles of males and the ovaries of females, although small amounts are also secreted by the adrenal glands. It is the principal male sex hormone and an anabolic steroid. See Testosterone: Aggression and criminality and Testosterone: Brain for more information on how testosterone effects behavior.

==== Estrogen ====
Estrogens, together, make up a group of primary female sex hormones synthesized in the ovaries. See Estrogen: Brain and behavior for more on the role of estrogen in behavioral endocrinology.

=== Thyroid Hormones ===
Thyroid hormones are responsible for controlling metabolism, nervous system, body temperature and development of several organ systems such as the reproductive system.

== Diseases and medicine ==
Hyperthyroidism and hypothyroidism are the two major dysfunctions associated to behavioral and brain chemistry changes due to the imbalances in the thyroid hormones, triiodothyronine (T_{3}) and thyroxine (T_{4}).

== History ==
Behavioral endocrinology has roots in ethology and is also seen as a combination of endocrinology and psychology. Like ethology, behavioral endocrinology focuses on behavior on the level of the whole organism. The invention of radioimmunoassay techniques revolutionized behavioral endocrinology, allowing scientists to see and quantify hormones. The field historically resists reductionist thinking and focuses on the physiological aspects of behavior.

=== Influential scientists ===
Charles Otis Whitman

Karl Lashley

== Organizations ==
1. Society of Behavioral Neuroendocrinology- Platform that provides a network between interested persons from all different experience levels.

== See also ==
- Neuroendocrinology
- Endocrinology
- Hormone
- Behavior
- Endocrine disease
- Neuroendocrine cell
- Evolutionary psychology
