= Neuroendocrinology =

Branch of biology studying interactions between the nervous and endocrine systems

Neuroendocrinology is the branch of biology (specifically of physiology) which studies the interaction between the nervous system and the endocrine system; i.e. how the brain regulates the hormonal activity in the body. The nervous and endocrine systems often act together in a process called neuroendocrine integration, to regulate the physiological processes of the human body. Neuroendocrinology arose from the recognition that the brain, especially the hypothalamus, controls secretion of pituitary gland hormones, and has subsequently expanded to investigate numerous interconnections of the endocrine and nervous systems.

The endocrine system consists of numerous glands throughout the body that produce and secrete hormones of diverse chemical structure, including peptides, steroids, and neuroamines. Collectively, hormones regulate many physiological processes. The neuroendocrine system is the mechanism by which the hypothalamus maintains homeostasis, regulating reproduction, metabolism, eating and drinking behaviour, energy utilization, osmolarity and blood pressure.

== Neuroendocrine system ==
=== Hypothalamus ===
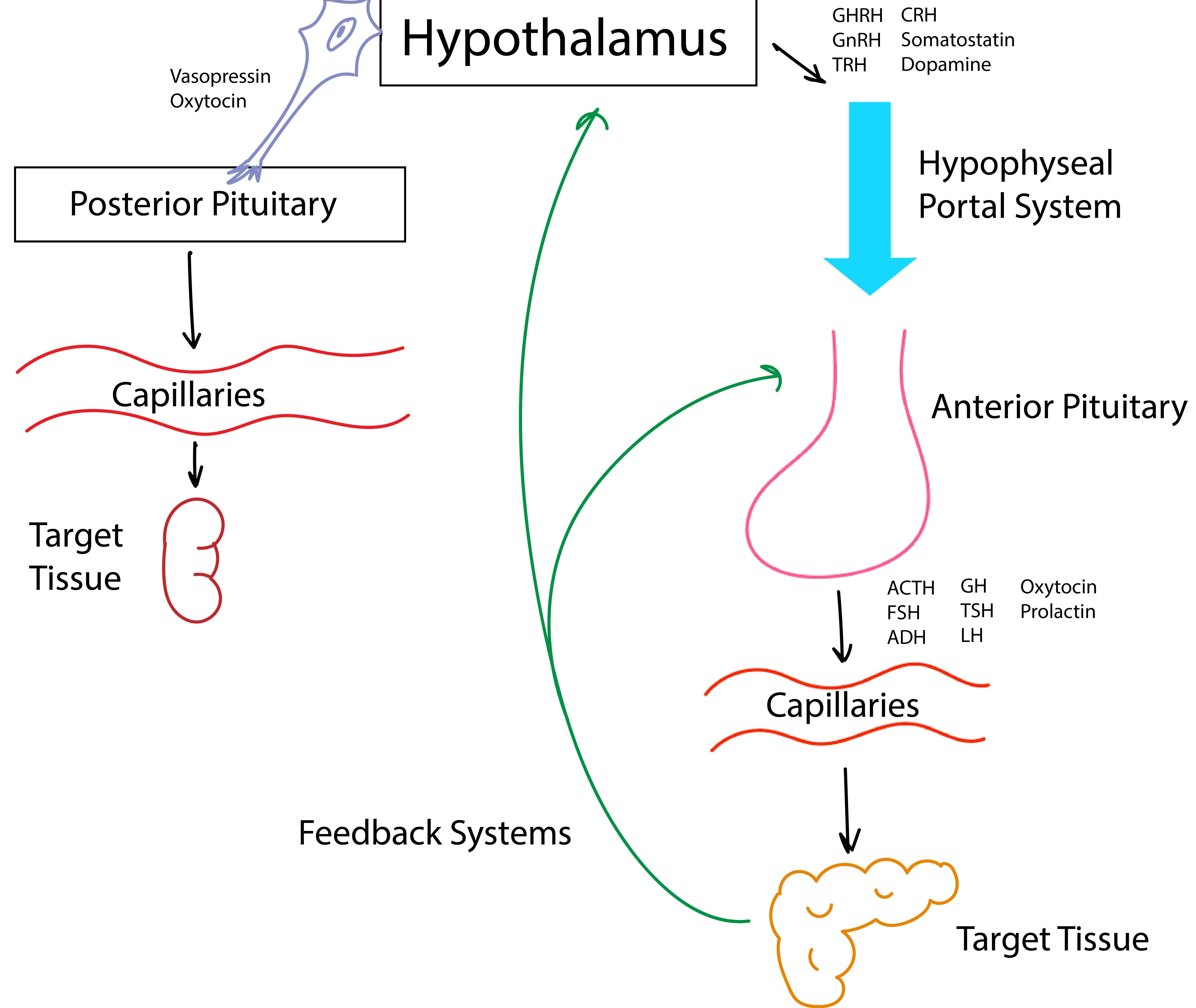
Hypothalamic interaction with the posterior and anterior pituitary glands. The hypothalamus produces the hormones oxytocin and vasopressin in its endocrine cells (left). These are released at nerve endings in the posterior pituitary gland and then secreted into the systemic circulation. The hypothalamus releases tropic hormones into the hypophyseal portal system to the anterior pituitary (right). The anterior pituitary then secretes trophic hormones into the circulation which elicit different responses from various target tissues. These responses then signal back to the hypothalamus and anterior pituitary to either stop producing or continue to produce their precursor signals.

The hypothalamus is commonly known as an integration center of the brain because of its role in integrating inputs from all areas of the brain and producing a specific response. In the neuroendocrine system, the hypothalamus receives electrical signals from different parts of the brain and translates those electrical signals into chemical signals in the form of hormones or releasing factors. These chemicals are then transported to the pituitary gland and from there to the systemic circulation.

=== Pituitary gland ===
The pituitary gland is divided into three lobes: the anterior pituitary, the intermediate pituitary lobe, and the posterior pituitary. The hypothalamus controls the anterior pituitary's hormone secretion by sending releasing factors, called tropic hormones, down the hypothalamo-hypophysial portal system. For example, thyrotropin-releasing hormone released by the hypothalamus in to the portal system stimulates the secretion of thyroid-stimulating hormone by the anterior pituitary.

The posterior pituitary is directly innervated by the hypothalamus; the hormones oxytocin and vasopressin are synthesized by neuroendocrine cells in the hypothalamus and stored at the nerve endings in the posterior pituitary. They are secreted directly into systemic circulation by the hypothalamic neurons.

=== Major neuroendocrine axes ===
Oxytocin and vasopressin (also called anti-diuretic hormone), the two neurohypophysial hormones of the posterior pituitary gland (the neurohypophysis), are secreted from the nerve endings of magnocellular neurosecretory cells into the systemic circulation. The cell bodies of the oxytocin and vasopressin neurons are in the paraventricular nucleus and supraoptic nucleus of the hypothalamus, respectively, and the electrical activity of these neurons is regulated by afferent synaptic inputs from other brain regions.

By contrast, the hormones of the anterior pituitary gland (the adenohypophysis) are secreted from endocrine cells that, in mammals, are not directly innervated, yet the secretion of these hormones (adrenocorticotrophic hormone, luteinizing hormone, follicle-stimulating hormone, thyroid-stimulating hormone, prolactin, and growth hormone) remains under the control of the hypothalamus. The hypothalamus controls the anterior pituitary gland via releasing factors and release-inhibiting factors; these are substances released by hypothalamic neurons into blood vessels at the base of the brain, at the median eminence. These vessels, the hypothalamo-hypophysial portal vessels, carry the hypothalamic factors to the anterior pituitary, where they bind to specific receptors on the surface of the hormone-producing cells.

For example, the secretion of growth hormone is controlled by two neuroendocrine systems: the growth hormone-releasing hormone (GHRH) neurons and the somatostatin neurons, which stimulate and inhibit GH secretion, respectively. The GHRH neurons are located in the arcuate nucleus of the hypothalamus, whereas the somatostatin cells involved in growth hormone regulation are in the periventricular nucleus. These two neuronal systems project axons to the median eminence, where they release their peptides into portal blood vessels for transport to the anterior pituitary. Growth hormone is secreted in pulses, which arise from alternating episodes of GHRH release and somatostatin release, which may reflect neuronal interactions between the GHRH and somatostatin cells, and negative feedback from growth hormone.

=== Functions ===
The neuroendocrine systems control reproduction in all its aspects, from bonding to sexual behaviour. They control spermatogenesis and the ovarian cycle, parturition, lactation, and maternal behaviour. They control the body's response to stress and infection. They regulate the body's metabolism, influencing eating and drinking behaviour, and influence how energy intake is utilised, that is, how fat is metabolised. They influence and regulate mood, body fluid and electrolyte homeostasis, and blood pressure.

The neurons of the neuroendocrine system are large; they are mini factories for producing secretory products; their nerve terminals are large and organised in coherent terminal fields; their output can often be measured easily in the blood; and what these neurons do and what stimuli they respond to are readily open to hypothesis and experiment. Hence, neuroendocrine neurons are good "model systems" for studying general questions, like "how does a neuron regulate the synthesis, packaging, and secretion of its product?" and "how is information encoded in electrical activity?"

== History ==
=== Pioneers ===
Walter Lee Gaines noted the activity of the pituitary in the lactation of cows in 1915. He also noted that anaesthesia could block lactation and response to the suckling reflex.

Ernst and Berta Scharrer, of LMU Munich the Albert Einstein College of Medicine are credited as co-founders the field of neuroendocrinology with their initial observations and proposals in 1945 concerning neuropeptides.

Geoffrey Harris is considered by many to be the "father" of neuroendocrinology. Harris, the Dr. Lee's Professor of Anatomy at Oxford University, is credited with showing that the anterior pituitary gland of mammals is regulated by hormones secreted by hypothalamic neurons into the hypothalamohypophysial portal circulation. By contrast, the hormones of the posterior pituitary gland are secreted into the systemic circulation directly from the nerve endings of hypothalamic neurons. This seminal work was done in collaboration with Dora Jacobsohn of Lund University.

The first of these factors to be identified are thyrotropin-releasing hormone (TRH) and gonadotropin-releasing hormone (GnRH). TRH is a small peptide that stimulates the secretion of thyroid-stimulating hormone; GnRH (also called luteinizing hormone-releasing hormone) stimulates the secretion of luteinizing hormone and follicle-stimulating hormone.

Roger Guillemin, a medical student of Faculté de Médecine of Lyon, and Andrew W. Schally of Tulane University isolated these factors from the hypothalamus of sheep and pigs, and then identified their structures. Guillemin and Schally were awarded the Nobel Prize in Physiology and Medicine in 1977 for their contributions to understanding "the peptide hormone production of the brain".

In 1952, Andor Szentivanyi, of the University of South Florida, and Geza Filipp wrote the world's first research paper showing how neural control of immunity takes place through the hypothalamus.

=== Modern scope ===
Today, neuroendocrinology embraces a wide range of topics that arose directly or indirectly from the core concept of neuroendocrine neurons. Neuroendocrine neurons control the gonads, whose steroids, in turn, influence the brain, as do corticosteroids secreted from the adrenal gland under the influence of adrenocorticotrophic hormone. The study of these feedbacks became the province of neuroendocrinologists. The peptides secreted by hypothalamic neuroendocrine neurons into the blood proved to be released also into the brain, and the central actions often appeared to complement the peripheral actions. So understanding these central actions also became the province of neuroendocrinologists, sometimes even when these peptides cropped up in quite different parts of the brain that appeared to serve functions unrelated to endocrine regulation. Neuroendocrine neurons were discovered in the peripheral nervous system, regulating, for instance, digestion. The cells in the adrenal medulla that release adrenaline and noradrenaline proved to have properties between endocrine cells and neurons, and proved to be outstanding model systems for instance for the study of the molecular mechanisms of exocytosis. And these, too, have become, by extension, neuroendocrine systems.

Neuroendocrine systems have been important to our understanding of many basic principles in neuroscience and physiology, for instance, our understanding of stimulus-secretion coupling. The origins and significance of patterning in neuroendocrine secretion are still dominant themes in neuroendocrinology today.

Neuroendocrinology is also used as an integral part of understanding and treating neurobiological brain disorders. One example is the augmentation of the treatment of mood symptoms with thyroid hormone. Another is the finding of a transthyretin (thyroxine transport) problem in the cerebrospinal fluid of some patients diagnosed with schizophrenia.

== Experimental techniques ==
Since the original experiments by Geoffrey Harris investigating the communication of the hypothalamus with the pituitary gland, much has been learned about the mechanistic details of this interaction. Various experimental techniques have been employed. Early experiments relied heavily on the electrophysiology techniques used by Hodgkin and Huxley. Recent approaches have incorporated various mathematical models to understand previously identified mechanisms and predict systemic response and adaptation under various circumstances.

=== Electrophysiology ===
Electrophysiology experiments were used in the early days of neuroendocrinology to identify the physiological happenings in the hypothalamus and the posterior pituitary especially. In 1950, Geoffrey Harris and Barry Cross outlined the oxytocin pathway by studying oxytocin release in response to electrical stimulation. In 1974, Walters and Hatton investigated the effect of water dehydration by electrically stimulating the supraoptic nucleus—the hypothalamic center responsible for the release of vasopressin. Glenn Hatton dedicated his career to studying the physiology of the Neurohypophyseal system, which involved studying the electrical properties of hypothalamic neurons. Doing so enabled investigation into the behavior of these neurons and the resulting physiological effects. Studying the electrical activity of neuroendocrine cells enabled the eventual distinction between central nervous neurons, neuroendocrine neurons, and endocrine cells.

=== Mathematical Models ===
==== Hodgkin-Huxley Model ====
The Hodgkin–Huxley model translates data about the current of a system at a specific voltage into time-dependent data describing the membrane potential. Experiments using this model typically rely on the same format and assumptions, but vary the differential equations to answer their particular questions. Much has been learned about vasopressin, GnRH, somatotrophs, corticotrophs, and lactotrophic hormones by employing this method.

==== Integrate-and-Fire Model ====
The integrate-and-fire model aims for mathematic simplicity in describing biological systems by focusing on, and only on, the threshold activity of a neuron. By doing so, the model successfully reduces the complexity of a complicated system; however it ignores the actual mechanisms of action and replaces them with functions that define how the output of a system depends on its input. This model has been used to describe the release of hormones to the posterior pituitary gland, specifically oxytocin and vasopressin.

==== Functional or Mean Fields Model ====
The functional or mean fields model relies on the premise "simpler is better". It strives to reduce the complexity of modelling multi-faceted systems by using a single variable to describe an entire population of cells. The alternative would be to use a different set of variables for each population. When attempting to model a system where multiple populations of cells interact, using several sets quickly becomes overcomplicated. This model has been used to describe several systems, especially involving the reproductive cycle (menstrual cycles, luteinizing hormone, prolactin surges). Functional models also exist to represent cortisol secretion, and growth hormone secretion.

== See also ==
- Behavioral endocrinology
- Molecular neuroscience
- Neurochemistry
- Neuroendocrine cell
- Neuroendocrine tumor
- Neuropharmacology
- Neuroscience
- Gut–brain axis
