= Hormones and Behavior =

- Discipline: Behavioral endocrinology
- Language: English
- Edited by: C.M. McCormick

Publication details
- History: 1969–present
- Publisher: Elsevier
- Frequency: 10/year
- Impact factor: 4.445 (2018)

Standard abbreviations
- ISO 4: Horm. Behav.

Indexing
- CODEN: HOBEAO
- ISSN: 0018-506X (print); 1095-6867 (web)
- LCCN: 70014346
- OCLC no.: 36980568

Links
- Journal homepage; Online access

Hormones and Behavior is a peer-reviewed scientific journal covering behavioral endocrinology. It is published by Elsevier and is an official journal of the Society for Behavioral Neuroendocrinology. The journal covers hormone-brain relationships and publishes original research articles from laboratory or field studies on species ranging from invertebrates to mammals. It focuses on neuroendocrine and endocrine mechanisms affecting the development of behavior and on the ecological and evolutionary significance of hormone-behavior relationships.

== Abstracting and indexing ==
The journal is abstracted and indexed in Scopus, Chemical Abstracts Service, Science Citation Index, Current Contents/Life Sciences, The Zoological Record, BIOSIS Previews, and Index Medicus/MEDLINE/PubMed. The 2018 journal impact factor for the journal was 4.445.
