= Delphine Parrott =

British endocrinologist and immunologist (1928–2016)

- Born: 2 May 1928; Dulwich, London, England
- Died: 17 January 2016 (aged 87); Mill Hill, London, England
- Education: Bedford College and King's College London School of Medicine
- Scientific career
- Fields: Endocrinology and immunology
- Workplaces: National Institute for Medical Research, Imperial Cancer Research Fund and University of Glasgow

Delphine Mary Vera Parrott FRSE (2 May 1928 – 17 January 2016) was a British endocrinologist, immunologist, and academic. She did research at the National Institute for Medical Research in the 1950s and the Imperial Cancer Research Fund in the 1960s.

In 1967, she moved to the University of Glasgow and became its first female professor in 1973. She became the Gardiner Professor of Immunology there in 1980 and retired in 1990.

She was an honorary member of the British Society for Immunology.

== Early life ==
She was born in Dulwich in May 1928. She studied physiology at Bedford College, graduating in 1949, and then gained a doctorate at King's College London School of Medicine in 1952.

== Career ==
Parrott's first job was for the Medical Research Council, working in their Clinical Endocrinology Research Unit in Edinburgh from 1952 to 1954. Alan Parkes then recruited her to assist him researching reproductive biology at the National Institute for Medical Research in Mill Hill. He valued her skill in vivisecting small animals and she started by transplanting ovaries into mice that had been sterilised by radiation, as a way of restoring their fertility. Another experiment led to a major paper which was published in Science in 1960: "Role of Olfactory Sense in Pregnancy Block by Strange Males".

In this case, she removed the olfactory bulb of female mice to show that this prevented them from aborting when exposed to a strange male. This confirmed that smell was involved in the Bruce effect. Her co-author, Hilda Bruce had previously shown that mice would have a miscarriage if they smelt a strange male.

At the Imperial Cancer Research Fund, she studied the immunological effect of the thymus, experimenting on newly born mice by observing the effects of removal of the thymus upon their immune system such as the production of lymphocytes. These results were widely debated as the findings were unexpected.

In 1967, she moved to the University of Glasgow, to work in the Department of Bacteriology and Immunology as a senior lecturer. In 1973, she became a professor, the first woman to hold a chair in Glasgow University's 500-year history. In 1974, she was made a Fellow of the Royal Society of Edinburgh.

In 1980, she became the head of the department and the Gardiner professor, when her predecessor, R.G. White, retired. She retired in 1990.

== Later life ==
Parrott died on 17 January 2016, aged 87.
