= Hoover-Drickamer effect =

Urine exposure prolonging oestrus period in mice

The Hoover-Drickamer effect occurs when adult female mice are exposed to the urine of pregnant and lactating adult female mice, resulting in a longer than typical oestrus period. The effect was first noted by J. E. Hoover and L. C. Drickamer in their 1979 study wherein they randomly assigned adult female mice to one of four treatment conditions: a control group where the subjects were exposed to water, a group that was exposed to the urine of pregnant mice, a group that was exposed to the urine of lactating mice and a group that was exposed to the urine of a singly caged female mouse.

The results of their study demonstrated that the adult female mice exposed to urine of pregnant or lactating females exhibited significantly longer mean periods of oestrus than adult females mice that had been in the control group or exposed to the urine of the singly caged female mouse. The female mice exposed to the urine of the pregnant and lactating mice were also found to ovulate during this atypical, longer oestrus period and successfully conceived and bore litters when mated with male mice. Hoover and Drickamer also found that while their initial method had been to psychically paint their subjects with the urine used, when mice were exposed to the urine by a capsule containing a soaked cotton ball, the effect still occurred, demonstrating the airborne nature of the pheromones in the urine of the pregnant and lactating mice.

== Discovery ==
The Hoover-Drickamer effect was initially demonstrated in J.E. Hoover and L.C. Drickamer's 1979 study. The researchers noted that while other studies had examined the effect of urine from pregnant and/or lactating females on the onset of puberty in young female mice, no work had been done to examine what urine from pregnant and/or lactating females would do to oestrous cycles in already matured female mice. Their research utilized two different experiments to demonstrate that female mouse oestrus cycles were effected upon exposure to urine from pregnant and/or lactating mice, and that pheromones were involved in this process.

In their first experiment of the study, Hoover and Drickamer randomly assigned 80 adult female rats to four treatment groups, a control group where subjects were exposed to water, a group where the subjects were exposed to the urine of pregnant mice, a group where the subjects were exposed to the urine of lactating mice and finally a group where subjects were exposed to the urine of a singly caged female mouse. Their findings were that subjects exposed to the urine of pregnant and lactating mice were in oestrus for significantly more days relative to the female mice in the control group or when exposed to the urine of the singly caged female mouse.

Their second experiment of the study utilized the same four subject groups, but they changed their method of exposing their subjects. Rather than painting the mice with the urine, they housed their subjects were capsules that contained soaked cotton balls (varied between water, urine from pregnant mice, urine from lactating mice and urine from a singly caged female, like experiment one). Parallel to the results of their first experiment, subjects housed with the capsules injected with the urine of pregnant and lactating mice demonstrated significantly more total oestrus smears over a twenty one day period, more complete oestrus cycles and a longer total duration of oestrus cycles relative to the subjects in the control group and the group that was exposed to the urine of the singly caged female.

== Hypothesized mechanisms ==
Hoover and Drickamer's original study did not delve into any specific mechanisms of action for the effect on female oestrus cycles beyond stating that the results of their work support the conclusion that some factor in the urine of the pregnant and lactating mice used did act to affect the oestrus cycles of the subjects used. Their conclusions suggested exploring the excretory components of the urine of pregnant and lactating mice to explore whether any substances in it constituted a pheromone that could impact mice on a physiological level such that oestrus cycles could be affected.

A 2006 study by Stephen D. Liberles and Linda B. Buck demonstrated that in mouse olfactory epithelium, there is a specialized receptor sub-class called the trace amine-associated receptor (TAAR). Some of these receptors were found to be activated by volatile amines in mouse urine and at least one presumed mouse pheromone. Future research requires a more specific breakdown to assess if the urine of pregnant and lactating mice is composed a particular set of amines, pheromone(s) or another chemical compound that may explain how mature female mouse oestrus cycles are effected by the urine of pregnant and lactating female mice.

== Behavioural expression ==
Female mice have been demonstrated to show sexual receptivity behaviour, including lordosis behavior when in estrus. Estrus results in the release of hormones such as estrogen and estradiol that facilitate sexually receptive behaviour. Lordosis in particular increases the likelihood of a successful copulation, and therefore overall reproductive success. Lordosis, like the Hoover-Drickamer effect, has been demonstrated to be initiated, at least in part, by sexual signals detected by olfactory chemosignals.

== Theorized purpose of the effect ==
Hoover and Drickamer's original discovery of the effect did not explicitly explore any potential adaptive features it may have.

As estrus increases the likelihood of sexually receptive behaviour in females, such that overall reproductive success is more likely, it may be the case that a prolonged estrus cycle is adaptive in the sense of allowing for a longer period of sexual receptivity for successful copulation and reproduction.

A similar phenomenon of menstrual synchrony has been investigated multiple times to determine whether or not it even exists, and if it is adaptive in nature. The same cannot be said of variations in duration of estrus. The rationale behind investigations into menstrual synchrony could also be applied to duration of estrus, including male monopolization of fertile females. While one argument against menstrual synchrony is to reduce interfemale competition, particular differences between species in terms of mating period and length may influence how useful the ability to mediate and change estrus is in the first place. Given that mice can breed year round, it may be adaptive for females to be able to influence each other's frequency of sexual receptivity in order to increase the likelihood of overall species survival.

Hoover and Drickamer's other work exploring the effect of urinary chemosignals on the change of the onset of puberty in female mice proposed a similar underlying mechanism that the urine of the pregnant and lactating females speeding up the onset of puberty in female mice signals that environment and/or social conditions are optimal for reproduction. This included factors like available food supply, weather conditions, and nest sites and materials. It may be the same for inducing a longer estrus cycle in other adult females such that mature female mice may also take advantage of environmental and social factors that increase the likelihood of successful reproduction. This could be explored by manipulating whether or not pregnant and lactating female mice continue to give off a urinary chemosignal when mating conditions are not optimum condition.

== See also ==
- Bruce effect
- Coolidge effect
- Lee-Boot effect
