= Clyde Wilson =

Clyde Wilson may refer to:

- Clyde Wilson (politician) (1889–1971), British politician
- Clyde H. Wilson (1889–after 1928), American college football and basketball coach
- Slim Wilson or Clyde Wilson (1910–1990), American singer, songwriter, bandleader, and radio and TV personality
- Clyde A. Wilson (1923–2008), American detective and private investigator
- H. Clyde Wilson Jr. (1926–2010), American professor of anthropology
- Clyde N. Wilson (born 1941), American professor of history, paleoconservative political commentator, writer and editor
- Clyde Wilson (cyclist) (born 1959), Bermudian Olympic cyclist

== See also ==
- Wilson Clyde (1934–2019), politician
