= The Great Pheromone Myth =

Book by Richard Doty

- Author: Richard L. Doty
- Subject: Pheromones
- Publisher: The Johns Hopkins University Press
- Publication date: 2010
- Pages: 278
- ISBN: 978-0801893476

The Great Pheromone Myth is a book on pheromones and their application to chemosensation in mammals by Richard L. Doty, director of the University of Pennsylvania's Smell and Taste Center in Philadelphia. Doty argues that the concept of pheromone introduced by Karlson and Lüscher is too simple for mammalian chemonsensory systems, failing to take into account learning and the context-dependence of chemosensation. In this book, he is especially critical of human pheromones, arguing that not only are there no definitive studies finding human pheromones, but that humans lack a functional vomeronasal organ to detect pheromones. Its publication received coverage in the news media, especially concerning its arguments that human pheromones do not exist.

== The pheromone concept ==
Karlson and Lüscher defined pheromones "..as substances which are secreted to the outside by an individual and received by a second individual of the same species in which they release a specific reaction, for example, a definite behaviour or a developmental process" (p. 55). To distinguish pheromones from other substances that can stimulate behaviors such as the scents of flowers or food odors, they emphasize that pheromones are "special messenger substances" such as sexual attractants in butterflies and moths. In their definition, pheromones are analogous to hormones such as testosterone or oxytocin, which are specific compounds. However, while hormones serve as chemical messengers within an individual organism, pheromones carry messages between individuals.

While the pheromone concept applies reasonably well to insects, Doty argues that there are serious problems with its application to mammals. The functions of pheromones, as specific types of compounds, are to produce unlearned, reflexive, and innate responses in recipients. Doty, however, argues that the chemical stimuli that mammals respond to are typically combinations of many compounds, that are sensed in complex social situations, and experience and learning are important for how mammals respond to chemical stimuli. For example, the Vandenbergh effect in mice occurs when puberty-accelerating pheromones are released in the urine of male mice. Doty shows that the effect depends on experience, that multiple compounds found in male mouse urine are involved in the effect, and the effect is not species specific since urine from male rats will also cause puberty acceleration in young female mice.

== Human pheromones ==
He argues that there is little or no scientific basis for human pheromones in the scientific literature. The vomeronasal organ, which is the sensory organ that takes in pheromone compounds in mammals such as mice and rats is a vestigial organ in humans. Menstrual synchrony has long been viewed as a physiological phenomenon in humans that could only be explained by the exchange of pheromones among women. He argues, however, that methodological critiques of menstrual cycle research and recent research indicate the menstrual synchrony does not occur among women. Finally, he reviews the literature on human pheromones and argues that there are serious methodological issues in all studies reporting human pheromones and that no human pheromone has ever been definitively identified.

His conclusion is that human pheromones are a myth that is driven in part by economics. What he calls the "junk-science industry of pheromone-perfumes, pheromone-soaps, and pheromone cosmetics" arose from misunderstood research with mammals. For example, androstenedione is a steroid hormone that is found in human sweat and is the main ingredient in commercially sold human pheromone products, but scientific research provides little evidence that it functions as a pheromone. Doty cites a study in which women sniffed sweaty T-shirts of men. The women preferred T-shirts worn by men whose immune system genes were most different from them, indicating that it was the mixture of genes a man had that was the important factor in which sweaty T-shirt a woman preferred and not the androstenedione secreted in his sweat. Androstenedione is produced by pigs in abundance. Doty quips: "Are women, in fact, attracted to the odors of male pigs or more willing to have sex in the presence of such odors? Are birth rates or other indices of sexual behavior higher in states or counties with pig farms?"

== Critical response ==
The book has generally been received well by the scientific community. According to Doty, those critical of the book range from people who refuse to read it to those who have semantic issues with the pheromone concept and its applicability to mammals. Peter Brennan argues that Doty does not consider some of the more recent scientific research that conflicts with his views. He cites a 2010 study in mice that reports the discovery of a urinary protein that attracts female mice. Brennan concludes: "I suspect that the majority of researchers will continue to use the term [pheromone], despite all of its shortcomings. But after reading this book, I will certainly be more circumspect when referring to pheromones in future."
