= Alan Sterling Parkes =

English biologist (1900–1990)

Sir Alan Sterling Parkes FRS CBE
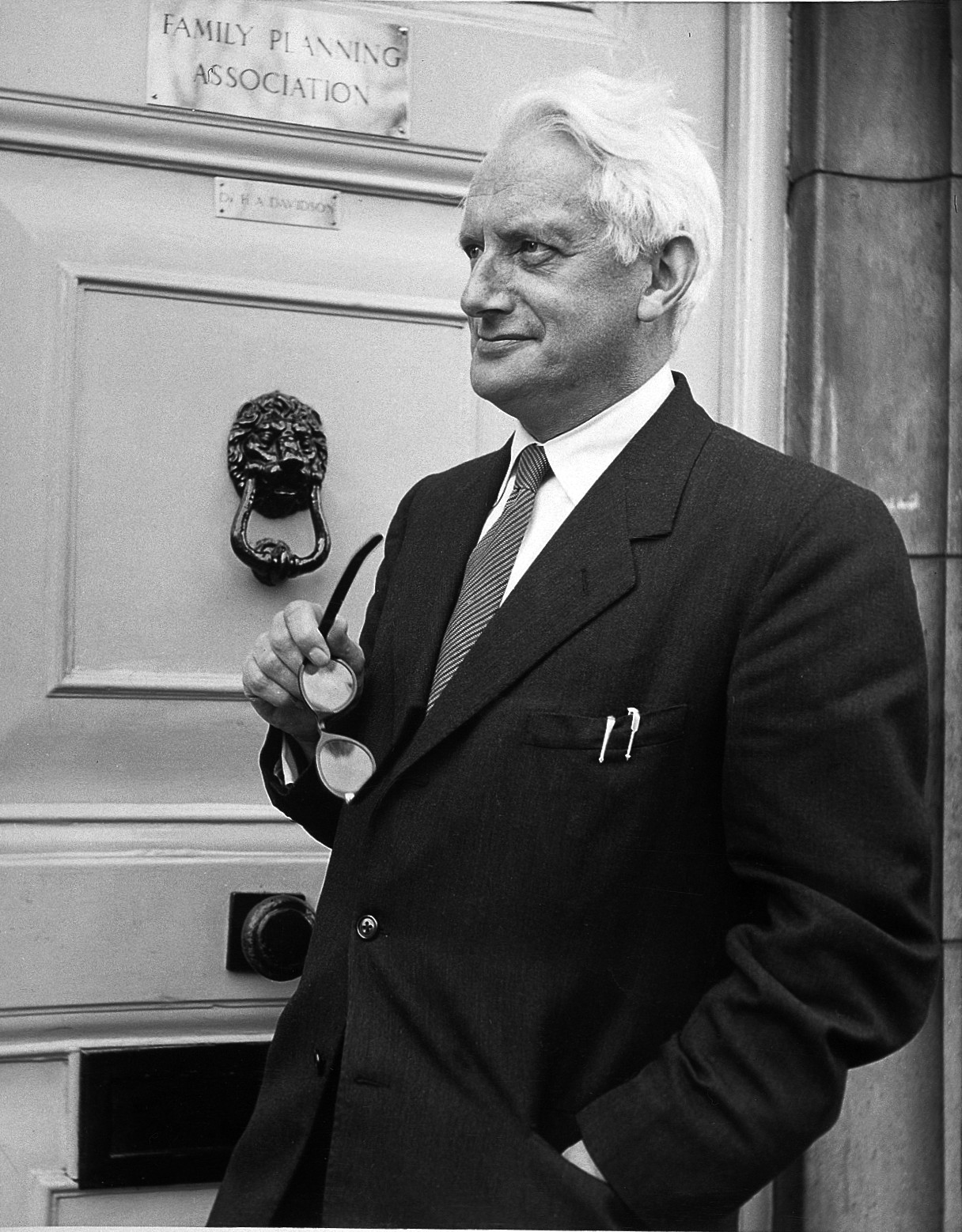
- Born: 10 September 1900
- Died: 17 July 1990 (aged 89)
- Education: Christ's College, Cambridge University of Manchester
- Awards: Cameron Prize for Therapeutics of the University of Edinburgh (1962)
- Scientific career
- Fields: Reproductive biology

Sir Alan Sterling Parkes, FRS, CBE (10 September 1900 – 17 July 1990) was an English reproductive biologist credited with Christopher Polge and Audrey Smith for the discovery that spermatozoa can be protected against induced damage induced by freezing and low-temperature storage using glycerol. This work enabled the development of the field of cryobiology.

Hall was educated at Willaston School.

He published on the reproductive effects of X-rays on mice, hormonal control of secondary sexual characteristics in birds, and aided Hilda Bruce in research that established the Bruce effect.

He was a member of the American Association for Anatomy.

In the 1960s, following the beginning of his involvement with the World Health Organization (WHO), Parkes became associated with international discussions on population control. In 1968, he founded the Journal of Biosocial Science and served as president of the Eugenics Society, an organization that, according to Alexander Friedrich and Stefan Höhne, had long explored the possibilities of cryogenic approaches to population policy.

In 1962, Parkes was awarded the Cameron Prize for Therapeutics of the University of Edinburgh.
