= Tuome (restaurant) =

Restaurant in New York City

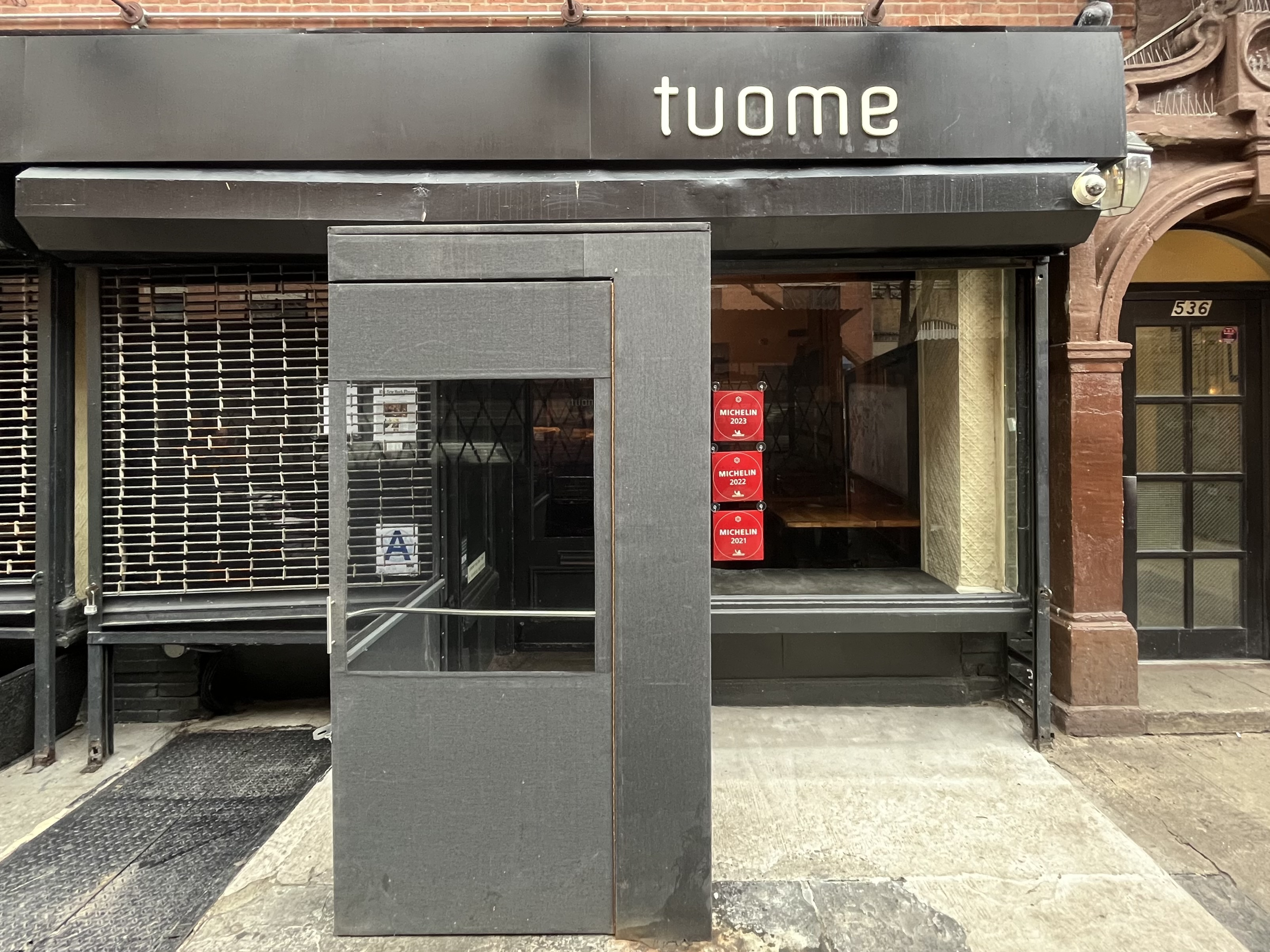
- Tuome in January 2024
- Interactive map of Tuome

Restaurant information
- Established: August 2014
- Chef: Thomas Chen
- Rating: (Michelin Guide)
- Location: 536 East 5th Street, New York City, New York, 10009, United States
- Coordinates: 40°43′26.8″N 73°58′58.1″W
- Website: tuomenyc.com

Tuome is a restaurant in the East Village neighborhood of Manhattan within Alphabet City in New York City. The restaurant serves New American cuisine with Asian influences; primarily Chinese due to the chef's background. The restaurant received a 2 star rating from The New York Times and a 4 star rating from Eater. The restaurant has received a Michelin star.

== History ==
Tuome's space was formerly occupied by Le Gamin, and later, Kuboya Ramen. Tuome was opened by Thomas Chen in August 2014. Before opening Tuome, Chen worked at restaurants including Eleven Madison Park and Jean-Georges.

The restaurant was first awarded a Michelin star as part of the 2019 guide to New York City.

== Reviews and accolades ==
Tejal Rao, in a review published by Bloomberg, praised Tuome's ambience and service.

== See also ==
- List of Michelin-starred restaurants in New York City
