= Kamerlingh Onnes =

Kamerlingh Onnes is a compound surname of Dutch origin. People with the name include:

- Harm Kamerlingh Onnes (1893–1985), Dutch portrait painter and ceramist
- Heike Kamerlingh Onnes (1853–1926), Dutch physicist and Nobel laureate
  - Kamerlingh Onnes (crater), a lunar impact crater
  - Kamerlingh Onnes Award for work in low-temperature science and technology
  - Kamerlingh Onnes Prize for work in superconductivity

== See also ==
- Onnes (disambiguation)
