= Martha McClintock =

American psychologist (born 1947)

Martha K. McClintock
- Born: February 22, 1947 (age 79); Pasadena, California
- Education: University of Pennsylvania; Wellesley College
- Scientific career
- Fields: Psychology
- Workplaces: University of Chicago
- Thesis: Sociobiology of Reproduction in the Norway rat (1974)
- Doctoral advisor: Norman Adler

Martha Kent McClintock (born February 22, 1947) is an American psychologist best known for her research on human pheromones and her theory of menstrual synchrony.

Her research focuses on the relationship that the environment and biology have upon sexual behaviour. She is the David Lee Shillinglaw Distinguished Service Professor in Psychology at the University of Chicago and is the Founder and past Director of the Institute for Mind and Biology.

== Education and career ==
McClintock was born in Pasadena, California, and obtained her bachelor's degree from Wellesley College in 1969. She received a PhD from the University of Pennsylvania and joined the Department of Psychology at the University of Chicago in 1976. She also holds faculty appointments in the Department of Comparative Human Development, the Committee on Evolutionary Biology, and the Committee on Neurobiology. She is a member of the American Academy of Arts and Sciences, the Institute of Medicine in the National Academy of Sciences. In 1982, she has received the APA Distinguished Scientific Award for an Early Career Contribution to Psychology for original and broadly conceived research on the social regulation of reproductive function.

In 1999, she founded the Institute for Mind and Biology at the University of Chicago, a research institute designed to foster transdisciplinary research in mind-body interactions and the biological basis of behavior. This Institute enabled the creation of the Center for Interdisciplinary Health Disparities Research (CIHDR), a multimillion-dollar initiative to explore and understand why African American women have a higher incidence of mortality from breast cancer than Caucasian women. McClintock is co-director of the center.

== Research ==
McClintock's current research focuses on the interaction between behavior and reproductive endocrinology and immunology. Since the connection between behavior and endocrine function, Dr. McClintock recently concentrate on the behavioral control of endocrinology, as well as to the hormonal and neuroendocrine mechanisms of behavior. She studies pheromones, sexual behavior, fertility and reproductive hormones from experiments on animals and parallel clinical processes in humans. She also studies the psychosocial origins of malignant and infectious disease.

While at Wellesley College, she investigated menstrual synchrony in women living in a college dormitory. She reported that women living together or who were friends synchronized their menstrual cycles. Subsequently, she proposed that menstrual synchrony is caused by the two opposing pheromones: one that shortens cycles and one that lengthens them.

In 1992 H. Clyde Wilson Jr., professor of anthropology at the University of Missouri, published a critique of McClintock's research in Psychoneuroendocrinology. In that article, as well as in a 1987 article on human pheromones and menstruation published in Hormones and Behavior, Wilson analyzed the research and data collection methods McClintock and others used in their studies. He found significant errors in the researchers' mathematical calculations and data collection as well as an error in how the researchers defined synchrony. Wilson's own clinical research, as well as his critical reviews of existing research, have demonstrated that menstrual synchrony in humans has not been adequately documented.

She has also published research indicating that androstadienone, found in sweat and saliva, can modify the psychological, physiological and hormonal responses of humans, a subtle form of human chemical communication.

McClintock believes that being able to control the ratio of male and female offspring in a litter can potentially lead to an improved understanding of the reasons that cause miscarriage. In general, Martha McClintock always tries to answer the question of how biology and one's environment influences sexual behaviour in her research.

== Awards ==
McClintock has received several awards, including the American Psychological Association's Distinguished Scientific Award for an Early Career Contribution to Psychology, the University of Chicago's Faculty Award for Excellence in Graduate Teaching, and the Wellesley College Alumnae Achievement Award. She was elected to the National Academy of Sciences' Institute of Medicine and the American Academy of Arts and Sciences. She is also a fellow of the American Association for the Advancement of Science, the Animal Behavior Society, the American Psychological Society, the American Psychological Association, and the International Academy of Sex Research.

== See also ==
- Androstenone
- Biopsychology
- Estratetraenol
- Neuroendocrinology
