= Richard Doty =

Richard Doty may refer to:

- Richard C. Doty, a retired Air Force Special Agent
- Richard L. Doty, a professor of psychology and otorhinolaryngology
