= Onnes =

Onnes may refer to:

- Onnes (general), one of the generals of the mythological Assyrian king Ninus
- Onnes, alternative spelling of Onnyos, a rural locality in Amginsky District of the Sakha Republic, Russia

== See also ==
- Onne
- Kamerlingh Onnes
