= Smell training =

Rehabilitation practice

Smell training or olfactory training is the act of regularly sniffing or exposing oneself to robust aromas with the intention of regaining a sense of smell. The stimulating smells used are often selected from major smell categories, such as aromatic, flowery, fruity, and resinous. Using strong scents, the patient is asked to sniff each different smell for a minimum of 20 seconds, no less than two times per day, for three to six months or more. It is used as a rehabilitative therapy to help people who have anosmia or post-viral olfactory dysfunction, a symptom of COVID-19. It was considered a promising experimental treatment in a 2017 meta-analysis.

== Efficacy ==
Along with olfactory implants, smell training is a promising but experimental treatment option.

Several individual studies have indicated that smell training can increase olfactory sensitivity. In 2021 a meta-analysis was published that examined research studies of olfactory training for treating loss of smell as a consequence of a viral infection. It found clinically significant improvements and supported its use as a treatment option. As of March 2021, there have been no studies of smell training's efficacy for children.

In 2017, the International and European Rhinologic Societies recommended smell training for treating loss of smell due to various conditions. In 2020, the British Rhinological Society published consensus guidelines for the treatment of smell loss due to COVID-19. Although no specific studies were available at that time, the expert panel made recommendations regarding treatment options and concluded that "olfactory training was recommended for all [COVID-19] patients with persistent loss of sense of smell of more than 2 weeks duration."

Critics such as Richard L. Doty have pointed to the small sample sizes in the studies and the potential for the observed improvements to have been the result of nerve regeneration that would have occurred without intervention as reason to be skeptical.

== Mechanism ==
Smell training likely achieves results because the olfactory nerve and olfactory bulb have neural plasticity and are able to regenerate.

== History ==
The idea was first written about by Thomas Hummel, a German psychologist at the Dresden University of Technology, in his 2009 paper "Effects of olfactory training in patients with olfactory loss". In his original study, Hummel instructed patients with olfactory dysfunction to follow a twice-a-day routine for twelve weeks. The routine included inhaling the odor of rose, lemon, clove, and eucalyptus (phenyl ethyl alcohol, citronellal, eugenol, and eucalyptol respectively) essential oils for ten seconds each. These intense odors each correspond to a different odor category in Henning's odor prism.

Hummel's paper built on a 1989 study by the Monell Chemical Senses Center in Philadelphia. The study showed that after repeated exposure to androstenone, a chemical which half of all humans cannot detect, some subjects gained the ability to smell it.

== Alternatives ==
In addition to smell training, other treatments for anosmia that have been researched include systemic steroidal and non-steroidal oral medications, topical medications, and acupuncture.
