= Norman Adler =

American Psychologist

Norman T. Adler
- Born: June 7, 1941; Chicago, Illinois
- Died: September 11, 2016 (aged 75); Jerusalem, Israel
- Education: University of California, Berkeley
- Scientific career
- Fields: Psychology
- Workplaces: University of Pennsylvania
- Thesis: The Role of the Male's Copulatory Behavior in Successful Pregnancy of the Female Rat (1967)
- Doctoral advisor: Frank A. Beach
- Doctoral students: Martha McClintock

Norman Tenner Adler (June 7, 1941 – September 11, 2016) was an American psychologist and biologist. Through his research, teaching, writing, and academic administration, he made major contributions to the modern study of biological psychology and in American higher education, having helped develop the fields that are now labeled behavioral neurobiology and evolutionary psychology. One of Adler's prominent experiments included an in depth analysis of mating performance of male rats and its relation to fertilization in the female, which led him to observe how behaviour could affect reproduction in species. With his students and colleagues, he has worked at the interface between biology and behavior. They have stressed the importance of combining the study of physiological mechanisms controlling behavior with the functional/adaptive significance of behavior in an evolutionary context. He was influenced in this approach by his undergraduate teachers at Harvard, especially Paul Rozin, Jerry Hogan, and Gordon Bermant, and his student colleagues like Don Pfaff with whom he has maintained scientific relationships over the years. His research was also impacted by Daniel Lehrman, and he worked closely with Lehrman's student, Barry Komisaruk, on hormones and neural functioning. Adler is also a prominent figure in American higher education, especially the role of behavioral neuroscience in liberal arts education and religion in the college classroom. He participated in Phillip Zimbardo's PBS TV series Discovering Psychology, one of the first distance-learning courses in psychology.

== Early life and education ==
A native of Chicago, where he attended public schools and received a Jewish education at the College of Jewish Studies. In high school, Adler was interested in the career of a rabbi and a psychoanalyst, but didn't know which one to choose. He became drawn towards science after taking biology with a teacher named Richard Boyajian, who motivated him to pursue a career in biology. During his years in Harvard college, he took a course in physiological psychology, which gave him the opportunity to acknowledge that there is in fact an area of study that can combine his interests in biology and psychology. Adler graduated from Harvard in 1962 with a major in Psychology and extensive coursework in biology. After College, he spent the next year traveling around the world under the auspices of Harvard's Frederick Sheldon Traveling Fellowship. He used the year to visit the European ethologists and study animal behavior and complex social systems in general ('The City' was the title of his summary essay from that year). To become familiar with the techniques of the classical ethologists, he spent time in Africa and other field sites. He also developed an early interest in comparative religion—but decided that the field of 'psychology of religion' was not yet ready to develop so stayed with biological psychology, which he felt was just beginning. At the latter part of his career, he has returned to the study of psychology and religion with his students and colleagues at Yeshiva University—profoundly impressed at the speed with which a dormant field 'took off' and with how important these issues were becoming on the American campus.

After the post-baccalaureate year of travel, Adler went to UC Berkeley, where he was a graduate student of Frank Beach (one of the founders of the study of hormones and behavior), and received a Master's in zoology with Howard Bern (comparative endocrinology). He then went to UCLA for a post-doctoral year with C. H. Sawyer (neuroendocrinology). He began his work on the effects of copulatory behavior on reproductive physiology. By making behavior the 'independent variable' and physiology the 'dependent variable', he felt that the adaptive significance of behavior would perforce be recognized in the biological system.

== Career ==
=== Academic history ===
He joined the faculty at the University of Pennsylvania, where he became the youngest tenured professor at the time. He is also widely known as the founder of the Biological Basis of Behavior Program at Penn which was the prototype of the integrative study of behavior from a biological perspective. This program became a national model and helped spur the development of behavioral neuroscience in the American undergraduate curriculum. For this work, he received the Dana Award for Pioneering Achievement in Higher Education. The University of Pennsylvania now presents an annual "Norman Adler Lecture in the Biological Basis of Behavior" in his honor.

He has had a number of distinguished students in the field, including Martha McClintock at the University of Chicago, Elizabeth Adkins-Regan at Cornell University, Avery Gilbert, Jack Yanovski, Alan Rosenwasser, Stephen Zoloth at Northeastern, Penny Bernstein at Kent State University, Joseph Anisko, Rodney Pelchat, Karen Stewart, and James Toner.

He served as Dean of Penn's Undergraduate College of Arts and Sciences, Dean of Yeshiva College for a decade, and was also Vice-Provost for Research and Graduate Education, and Professor of Psychology, at Northeastern University. He has also held visiting, teaching, or research appointments at University of Edinburgh, Drexel University Dept. of Engineering, and Swarthmore College.

He was University Professor of Psychology at Yeshiva University and Special Assistant to the Provost for Curriculum and Research Initiatives.

=== Contributions to higher education ===
In addition to his work in behavioral neuroscience and its dissemination across American academics, he is an authority in American higher education, specializing in interdisciplinary and integrative learning. He initiated the Penn Reading Project in 1991 which has continued for over 20 years as an integrative introduction to liberal learning for college freshmen newly arriving on campus. Subsequently, Freshman Reading Projects have been adopted widely as part of the "first-year experience" at many college campuses. For this work, in 1992 Adler was inducted as an honorary member of the University of Pennsylvania's Philomathean Society—the oldest continually existing collegiate literary society in the United States.

He currently serves on the editorial board of Liberal Education, the journal of the American Association of Colleges and Universities; chairs a project for AACU's section on ‘Big Questions: Faith and Reason on the College Campus’. In this project, citing data that there is a high level of spirituality among students in College because they continually question the "deeper" issues in their lives, the modern curriculum needs to address this. He lectures widely and is a consultant to universities and foundations.

He has received numerous prizes and honors, including two Guggenheim Fellowships, Sigma Xi National Lecture, Phi Beta Kappa, Fellowship to Center for Advanced Study in the Behavioral sciences, Lindback Award for Teaching Excellence, and was in the first group of recipients for the American Psychological Association's Distinguished Scientific Awards for Early Career Contributions to Psychology.

== See also ==
- Martha McClintock
- Discovering Psychology
