= Avery Gilbert =

American geneticist

Avery Gilbert is a self-described "smell scientist" and "sensory psychologist".

== Early life and education ==
Gilbert received his Ph.D. in Psychology from the University of Pennsylvania under the tutelage of Norman Adler.

== Career ==
He is most known for his book What the Nose Knows: The Science of Smell in Everyday Life published by Crown Publishing Group. The book was a finalist for the 2008 Los Angeles Times Book Prize in Science & Technology, while also shortlisted for the 2009 Royal Society Prize for Science Books".

In an interview with online fragrance magazine Sniffapalooza, Gilbert states that he was inspired to write What the Nose Knows when his science colleagues expressed enthusiasm for his tough review of Chandler Burr's The Emperor of Scent published in Nature Neuroscience in April 2003. Gilbert wrote that Burr's biography of geneticist and Perfumes: The Guide author Luca Turin was "giddy and overwrought ... a triumphalist account of an unproven alternate theory".

Gilbert founded the Cranial One Corporation, developing a rapid smell test—the Cranial I Quick Sniff—for use by physicians and consumer research companies. He sold the company in 2005. He previously founded Synesthetics, Inc., a multisensory research and consulting company specializing in the consumer impact of smell, co-authored the National Geographic Smell Survey, served as President of the Sense of Smell Institute, VP for Sensory Psychology at Givaudan Roure Fragrances, VP of sensory research for DigiScents (which shut down in 2001 due to lack of additional funding—the company had invested $20 million to develop technology to provide the sense of smell to the Internet, including investments from Givaudan and Quest International).

Gilbert was the subject of a recent Podcast by the New York Academy of Sciences. Katie Puckrik video-interviewed Avery Gilbert for her website, 'Katie Puckrik Smells'.
