= Elizabeth Adkins-Regan =

American neuroendocrinologist

- Born: Elizabeth Kocher; July 1945 (age 81)
- Education: University of Maryland, College Park; University of Pennsylvania
- Spouse: Dennis T. Regan (m. 1980)
- Scientific career
- Fields: Neuroendocrinology
- Workplaces: Bucknell University; State University of New York College at Cortland; Cornell University
- Doctoral advisor: Norman Adler
- Website: reganlab.cornell.edu

Elizabeth Adkins-Regan (née Kocher; born July 1945) is an American comparative behavioral neuroendocrinologist best known for her research on the hormonal and neural mechanisms of reproductive behavior and sexual differentiation in birds. She is currently a professor emeritus in the Department of Psychology and the Department of Neurobiology and Behavior at Cornell University.

== Education and career ==
Adkins-Regan received her B.S. in Psychology from the University of Maryland, College Park in 1967. She earned her Ph.D. in Physiological Psychology from the University of Pennsylvania in 1971. She was one of the first graduate students of Norman T. Adler. Her dissertation research focused on the hormonal control of mating behavior in Japanese quail.

After receiving her graduate degree, she was an assistant professor at Bucknell University from 1972 to 1974 and then at the State University of New York College at Cortland from 1974 to 1975. She joined the faculty at Cornell University as an assistant professor in the Department of Psychology and the Department of Neurobiology and Behavior in 1975. She became an associate professor at Cornell in 1981. In 1986, she received a Fulbright Research Scholar Award to work as a visiting scientist at the French National Institute for Agricultural Research (INRA), where she studied the sexual differentiation of behavior in pigs. She became a full professor in the Department of Psychology and Department of Neurobiology and Behavior at Cornell University in 1988.

In 2005, she published the book Hormones and Animal Social Behavior, a major synthesis of the study of animal social behavior and steroid and peptide hormones. She served as the Editor-in-Chief of the journal Hormones and Behavior from 2008 to 2011 and was the president of the Society for Behavioral Neuroendocrinology from 2015 to 2017.

== Research ==
In her early research using the Japanese quail, Adkins-Regan performed a number of fundamental experiments on the mechanisms of sexual differentiation of behavior in birds, which have a ZW sex determination system. Her work demonstrated that, unlike what is observed in mammalian sexual differentiation, female-typical reproductive behavior can be activated in both male and female Japanese quail by estrogen treatment. She also demonstrated that treatment of male Japanese quail embryos with estrogens de-masculinizes behavior, resulting in adult males that fail to show male-typical courtship behavior even when later treated with testosterone. These experimental findings suggested a model of sexual differentiation for birds in which the steroid hormone estradiol secreted by the heterogametic sex (in this case, females) is responsible for the process of differentiation. Thus, the absence of male-type sexual behavior in adult females would result from their early exposure to endogenous estrogens, a process that would be experimentally reproduced in males by the injection of exogenous estradiol.

In the 1980s, her research program expanded to include research in both Japanese quail and zebra finches. In the socially-monogamous zebra finches, she performed a series of parallel experiments demonstrating the effects of steroid hormones on the development sexually differentiated behaviors in these songbirds.

Adkins-Regan's later research focused on the hormonal and neural mechanisms of a broader range of reproductive and social behaviors in birds, including courtship, mate choice, pair formation, mating behavior, parental behavior and aggression. She also published research in 2016 demonstrating that King quail, a closely related species to the Japanese quail, form monogamous pair bonds.

== Hormones and Animal Social Behavior ==
On 7 August 2005, she published Hormones and Animal Social Behavior.

== Personal life ==
Adkins-Regan has been married to the Cornell University social psychologist Dennis T. Regan since 1980.

== Awards and recognitions ==
- Daniel S. Lehrman Lifetime Achievement Award in Behavioral Neuroendocrinology, Society for Behavioral Neuroendocrinology, 2019
- Exemplar Award, Center for the Integrative Study of Animal Behavior, Indiana University, 2017
- Howard Bern Award, Society for Integrative and Comparative Biology (SICB), 2016
- Fellow of the American Association for the Advancement of Science (AAAS), elected 1984
- Fellow of the Association for Psychological Science, elected 1998
- Fellow of the Animal Behavior Society, elected 1991
- American Fulbright Research Scholar Award, 1986-1987
- National Science Foundation Graduate Fellow, 1967-1971

== Notable publications ==
- Adkins, E. K., & Adler, N. T. (1972). Hormonal control of behavior in the Japanese quail. Journal of Comparative and Physiological Psychology, 81(1), 27–36. doi:10.1037/h0033315
- Adkins, E. K. (1975). Hormonal basis of sexual differentiation in the Japanese quail. Journal of Comparative and Physiological Psychology, 89(1), 61–71. doi:10.1037/h0076406
- Adkins, E. K. (1976). Embryonic exposure to an antiestrogen masculinizes behavior of female quail. Physiology & Behavior, 17(2), 357–359. doi: 10.1016/0031-9384(76)90088-3
- Adkins, E. K., & Pniewski, E. E. (1978). Control of reproductive behavior by sex steroids in male quail. Journal of Comparative and Physiological Psychology, 92(6), 1169–1178. doi:10.1037/h0077523
- Adkins, E. K. (1979). Effect of Embryonic Treatment with Estradiol or Testosterone on Sexual Differentiation of the Quail Brain. Critical Period and Dose-Response Relationships. Neuroendocrinology, 29(3), 178–185. doi:10.1159/000122920
- Adkins-Regan, E., Abdelnabi, M., Mobarak, M., Ottinger, M. A. (1990). Sex steroid levels in developing and adult male and female zebra finches (Poephila guttata). Gen. Comp. Endocrinol. 78(1), 93-109. doi:10.1016/0016-6480(90)90051-m.
- Adkins-Regan, E. (2005). Hormones and Animal Social Behavior. Princeton University Press. ISBN 9780691092478
