= Coolidge effect =

Sexual phenomenon

The Coolidge effect is a biological phenomenon seen in some animals, whereby males exhibit renewed sexual interest whenever a new female of reproductive availability is introduced, even after sex with prior but still available sexual partners. To a lesser extent, the effect is also seen among females with regard to their mates.

The Coolidge effect can be attributed to an increase in sexual responsiveness, and a shortening of the sexual refractory period. The evolutionary benefit to this phenomenon is that a male can fertilize multiple females. The male may be reinvigorated repeatedly for successful insemination of multiple females. This type of mating system can be referred to as polygyny, where one male has multiple female mates, but each female mates with only one or a few males. The Coolidge effect has been demonstrated to occur in humans across cultures and in both sexes.

== Origin of the term ==
In a 1974 letter, behavioral endocrinologist Frank A. Beach claims to have introduced the term "Coolidge effect" in either 1958 or 1959. He attributed the neologism to an old joke about Calvin Coolidge when he was President of the United States.

The President and Mrs. Coolidge were being shown [separately] around an experimental government farm. When [Mrs. Coolidge] came to the chicken yard she noticed that a rooster was mating very frequently. She asked the attendant how often that happened and was told, "Dozens of times each day." Mrs. Coolidge said, "Tell that to the President when he comes by." Upon being told, the President asked, "Same hen every time?" The reply was, "Oh, no, Mr. President, a different hen every time." President: "Tell that to Mrs. Coolidge."

The joke appears in a 1972 book (Aggression in Man and Animals, by Roger N. Johnson, p. 94).

== Empirical evidence ==
The original experiments with rats applied the following protocol: A male rat was placed into an enclosed large box with four or five female rats in heat. He immediately began to mate with all the female rats repeatedly until he eventually became exhausted. The females continued nudging and licking him, yet he did not respond. When a novel female was introduced into the box, he became alert and began to mate once again with the new female. This phenomenon is not limited to common rats.

The Coolidge effect is attributed to an increase in dopamine levels and the subsequent effect upon an animal's limbic system. In a study conducted by Fiorino et al., male rats were used to study the role of the mesolimbic dopamine system on their sexual behaviour. In their experiment, microdialysis was used to monitor dopamine efflux from the nucleus accumbens during three stages of sexual behaviour, these included: copulation, sexual satiety, and the reinitiation of sexual behaviour. Behavioural testing for the Coolidge effect consisted of several phases including, copulation with a female, reintroduction to the same female, access to the same female, introduction to a novel female, and copulation with the novel female. During these phases, dopamine and its metabolites were monitored. Results from this study found that overall there was a significant increase in dopamine efflux in response to both the first female and the second female. During copulation with the first female, concentrations of dopamine in these male rats showed a significant increase, however, when the same female was presented again, a significant increase in dopamine was not observed. When a novel female was presented, initially, there was a small increase in the levels of dopamine, however, after continued copulation with the novel female, a significant increase in dopamine levels was observed. From these results, they concluded that an increase in mesolimbic dopamine efflux is associated with the appetitive and consummatory stages of sexual behaviour in male rats. Their data also suggest that stimuli associated with a novel female may increase dopamine transmission in a rat that is sexually satiated, and hence have a role in the reinitiation of sexual behaviour.

Additional studies have also provided further evidence for the role of the nucleus accumbens on sexual behaviour in rats. In a study conducted by Wood et al., male rats were divided into three conditions, and were presented with a cotton ball laden in either saline (control group), estrous vaginal smear of a familiar female (experimental group), and estrous vaginal smear of a novel female (experimental group). In this experiment, the role of the nucleus accumbens was characterized through recording neuronal activity of single cells in this area of the brain. Results from this study showed a greater proportion of neuronal activation when initially presented with a novel estrus stimulus in comparison to familiar estrus stimulus. Subsequent presentations of the novel estrus stimulus did not show an increase in neuronal activity.

== Allocating sperm ==
It has been observed that in certain species, males allocate sperm differently due to the Coolidge effect. The allocation is usually according to level of sperm competition, female novelty, and female reproductive quality. An experiment performed on an external fertilizing fish called Rhodeus amarus, also known as the European bitterling, was used to show that sperm can be allocated differently if a novel partner is around, but that it also happens if there is male-male competition. It is important to know that the European bitterling mating system works by females depositing their eggs into the gill filaments of freshwater mussels by her long ovipositor and then males proceed by ejecting their sperm into the gills of the mussel hosting the eggs. This means fertilization and development of the offspring relies on the quality and survival of the mussel. When the Coolidge effect was applied to this system, the experiment showed that it is the mussels, or the site of fertilization, that the males prefer to be novel. However, the takeaway from the experiment performed was that in male-male competition of the Rhodeus amarus, the dominant male will allocate more sperm when a novel mussel is present, while the subordinate male conserved its sperm until a proper opportunity came where it had a better chance of fertilization. A similar result was found in fowls, Gallus gallus, where the male showed a sperm allocation due to the Coolidge effect. The experiment found that male fowls reduce sperm investment in particular females they've encountered already, but increase sperm investment instantaneously if they encountered a new female.

Wedell et al. suggest a theory that when a male allocates sperm so that he can save sperm for novel partners, he limits himself and the mate by possibly investing too little sperm to their partners which in return can inseminate only a few eggs therefore making reproduction less successful. This could even possibly force females to seek more copulation to ensure successful reproduction. These types of evidence of sperm allocation would suggest that Coolidge effect will determine how much sperm is invested into females, and if possible, sperm will be allocated so that sperm can be evenly distributed for multiple mates. Overall, it is typically seen that allocation changes due to male-male competition and whether a novel partner is encountered or not.

== Absence ==
The Coolidge effect is typically found in most animals; however, there are instances where the Coolidge effect is absent. A study in decorated crickets, Gryllodes sigillatus, showed that even though females do display the Coolidge effect, the males in this species have no preference for novel mates. Because the females in this species control copulation, to test the Coolidge effect in males, two dead females were used. One female was already previously mated and the other was a novel female. To measure the Coolidge effect, the variables examined were the amount of courtship for the preferred mate and the size of the spermatophore transferred to the female. The size of the spermatophore was measured by weighing the mass after it was transferred to the female. The outcome of the experiment showed that there was no difference in the latency to re-mating of males confined with novel females and those paired with previous mates. There also was no difference in mass of the spermatophore. This experiment would suggest that the Coolidge effect is not applicable since the males of the Gryllodes sigillatus do not prefer novel females. Further research done on spiders also supports the possibility of absence of the Coolidge effect in certain species. Another study that focused on the Coolidge effect in simultaneously hermaphroditic species confirmed the validity of the Coolidge effect in freshwater snail Lymnaea stagnalis. Biomphalaria glabrata, another simultaneous hermaphrodite freshwater snail, does not exhibit sex-specific effects of partner novelty, and thus there is either no Coolidge effect in the species or no difference between the degrees to which the effect is expressed in the respective sexes.

== Means of sexual recognition for mates ==
Though there is not just a single reason why males will choose a novel partner, there have been experiments that show that in several species, the major determining factor for detecting a novel partner is olfactory preference. An experiment using Long-Evans rats, showed that odor played a major role in distinguishing the difference between a novel partner and familiar partner. In their experiment, Carr et al. paired each male rat with a female rat and allowed them to mate. Male rats were then tested for preference through the use of an apparatus that had two cylinders that were attached to their home cage and contained the familiar female and the novel female in each cylinder. Caps at the end of these cylinders prevented access to the females but had a hole in them to allow their odors to pass through to the male's cage. Before the testing phase, the females were removed, and then the caps were removed to allow the male to explore both cylinders. From this experiment, they found that males preferred the scent of the novel female. While these males did not have access to these females to demonstrate mating preferences, this odor preference is believed to reflect promiscuous behavior, and therefore be important to the male mating strategy.

In an earlier experiment, also conducted by Carr et al., they found that, unlike male rats, female rats preferred the odor of a familiar partner rather than the odor of a novel partner.

Another study also examined not only olfactory preference but also what part of the brain targeted the olfactory preference. In this study, male hamsters were given lesions to either the hippocampus or the perirhinal-entorhinal cortex or received a sham treatment. Then the hamsters were allowed to mate with a female hamster until they became satiated. All subjects were then presented with two anesthetized females, one of whom was the female they had previously copulated with, while the other was a novel female. Hamsters with sham and hippocampal lesions investigated the anogenital region of the novel females for a significantly longer period in comparison to the familiar females. Males with lesions to the perirhinal-entorhinal cortex did not show a preference for either a familiar or novel female and spent a similar amount of time investigating the anogenital region of both females. The results from this study revealed that the perirhinal-entorhinal cortex region of the brain in golden hamsters is crucial for the recognition of familiar conspecifics and certain social behaviors. The conclusion from this experiment was also consistent in rats and monkeys, since damage to this region of the brain impaired standard recognition memory, which would suggest that the hippocampal region of the brain is not crucial in social behavior memory, but rather, the perirhinal-entorhinal cortex.

This effect of olfaction has also been observed in invertebrates such as flies. In a study conducted by Tan and colleagues, the role of olfaction in species recognition was examined using flies, Drosophila melanogaster, which processed a mutated Orco gene, which codes for a co-receptor that is important for olfaction. The result of this type of mutation renders these flies unable to discriminate between phenotypically familiar (i.e., from the same family and/or environment) and phenotypically novel (i.e., unrelated and from a different environment) females. When presented with a phenotypically familiar and phenotypically novel female, mutant flies did not show a preference towards either female, while wild-type flies (i.e., flies without the mutated Orco gene) did. The results from this experiment suggest that the Orco gene is important in discriminating between mates, and suggests an important role of olfactory cues in phenotypic familiarity.

== Sexual satiety ==
Although males typically will prefer novel mates every time the opportunity is present, there is a physical limit to the sex drive. An experiment performed on rats showed that when left to reproduce to sexual satiety, the motor ejaculatory behavior, intromission, and dislodging seminal plugs were all possible after multiple mates, but little to no sperm would be produced during ejaculation. The experiment also concluded that males that reached satiety and non-satiety males both had the similar amounts of intromissions and time spent dislodging the seminal plug. Another study performed on rats showed the same results, but found data that concluded that reaching optimal chances of impregnating their mates happened after resting for 15 days. These experiments would suggest that one of the major limitations on the Coolidge effect is the physical boundaries of gamete production.

== Potentiality in female animals ==
While the Coolidge effect is usually demonstrated by males—that is, males displaying renewed excitement with a novel female—the body of research into the phenomenon continues to explore the potentiality of the effect in females, specifically rodents. Research examining female rats has lent its support, wherein female rats showed a higher incentive motivation for unknown males over ones they had just copulated with.

In a study conducted in 2013, researchers conducted an experiment to test if the Coolidge effect could be observed in female rats. In their experiment, they assigned female rats to one of two conditions: paced or non-paced. In the paced condition, females were able to control the timing of copulation, while in the non-paced condition males regulated the timing of mating. Females in the paced condition were placed into an arena that was divided into two compartments which contained holes that only the female could pass through. The female was placed on one side of the divided arena, and the male was placed in the opposite side; this allowed the female to enter and exit the male's side depending on the circumstances, therefore regulating the timing of copulation. In the non-paced condition, both the female and male rats were placed in an undivided arena and were allowed to mate. In both conditions, females were exposed to a constant, familiar male followed by a novel male. Their results found that females showed a significant increase in proceptive behaviours when a novel mate was present, but only if the female could regulate mating. Repeated mating with the same male also resulted in a decrease in proceptivity, which is thought to suggest sexual satiety. These results suggest that the Coolidge effect may also be present in female rats.

Lester and Gorzalka developed a model to determine whether or not the Coolidge effect also occurs in females. Their experiment, which used hamsters instead of rats, concluded that it does occur to a lesser degree in females, where the evolutionary advantage of mating with multiple partners is less straightforward. It is possible that the presence of the Coolidge effect in females could serve to optimize the female's reproductive success, and prevent mating with a sterile male. Mating with multiple males may reduce the probability that the female's gametes will not be successfully fertilized.

== See also ==
- Adultery
- Adultery laws
- Bruce effect
- Casual sex
- Extramarital sex
- Fornication
- Hookup culture
- Premarital sex
- Promiscuity
- Swinging
