= Tejal Rao =

Restaurant critic and writer

- Born: 1982 or 1983 (age 42–43); London, United Kingdom
- Education: Emerson College (BA)
- Alma mater: Emerson College
- Occupations: Restaurant critic, journalist, writer
- Employer(s): The Village Voice, New York Times, Bloomberg L.P.
- Website: www.tejalrao.com

Tejal Rao (born 1982 or 1983) is a restaurant critic, recipe developer and writer based in Los Angeles. She is one of the two chief restaurant critics for The New York Times. In 2018, she was named the first California restaurant critic for The New York Times. In 2021, she was named editor of the New York Times subscription cooking newsletter The Veggie.

== Early life and education ==
Rao was born in London, but lived in Kuwait, Sudan, and France during her youth before settling in Cobb County, Georgia as a teenager.

Rao attended Emerson College, where she earned a BA in literature.

== Career ==
In 2012, Rao joined The Village Voice as a food critic. In 2013, Rao won the James Beard Foundation’s Craig Claiborne Distinguished Restaurant Review Award for her work for The Village Voice.

In 2014, Rao joined Bloomberg as a restaurant critic. In 2016, she won the James Beard Foundation’s Craig Claiborne Distinguished Restaurant Review Award once again, this time for her work at Bloomberg. In the same year, Rao joined The New York Times as a reporter and monthly columnist for its magazine. In 2018, she was named The New York Times' first California restaurant critic, to better serve the growing number of New York Times readers in the state.

In 2021, Rao started the vegetarian recipe newsletter The Veggie. Although she is not a vegetarian, Rao enjoys cooking vegetarian food.

In June 2025, The New York Times appointed Rao as one of its two new chief restaurant critics, marking a shift toward nationally focused restaurant coverage and ending the tradition of critic anonymity.

Rao has also contributed to a range of other publications, such as The Atlantic, Edible, and Gourmet, among others.

== Personal life ==
In December 2020, she contracted COVID-19 and lost her sense of smell. She used smell training to regain it over the course of two months. She lives in Los Angeles.

== Awards and accolades ==
- 2012 – Forbes 30 under 30, Food & Wine
- 2013 – James Beard Foundation Awards, Craig Claiborne Distinguished Restaurant Review Award for "Bangkok Pop, No Fetishes; The Sweet Taste of Success; Enter the Comfort Zone at 606 R&D"
- 2016 – James Beard Foundation Awards, Craig Claiborne Distinguished Restaurant Review Award for "A Health Food Restaurant So Cool It Will Have You Happily Eating Seeds"; "Revisiting Momofuku Ko, After the Revolution"; "Polo Bar Review: Ralph Lauren Corrals the Fashionable Herd"
- 2019 – Vilcek Prize for Creative Promise in Culinary Arts
