= Wesley Kingston Whitten =

Australian reproductive biology professor

- Born: 1 August 1918; Macksville, New South Wales Australia
- Died: 24 May 2010 (aged 91); Canberra, Australia
- Education: University of Sydney
- Known for: Reproductive biology Pheromones
- Awards: Fellow, Australian Academy of Science; Marshall Medal, Society for the Study of Fertility
- Scientific career
- Fields: Reproductive biology
- Workplaces: Australian National University; Jackson Laboratory, Bar Harbor, Maine

Wesley Kingston Whitten (1 August 1918 – 24 May 2010) was a professor of reproductive biology at the Australian National University and later director of the Jackson Laboratory, Bar Harbor, Maine, United States. He was educated at the University of Sydney receiving a BVSc with honors in 1939; a BSc in 1941; and DSc in 1962. He was a Walter and Eliza Hall Fellow in Veterinary Science from 1940 to 1941. He served in the Australian Army Veterinary Corps and was an Australian Army Service Corps Captain from 1941 to 1945. He was research officer in Commonwealth Scientific and Industrial Research Organisation (CSIRO) from 1946 to 1949. He was director of animal breeding and fellow in the John Curtin School of Medical Research, Australian National University from 1950 to 1961. He was assistant director of the National Biological Standards Laboratory, Canberra, Australia from 1961 to 1966. He was staff scientist at the Jackson Laboratory, Bar Harbor, Maine, USA from 1966 to 1969, became senior staff scientist from 1969 to 1980, and assistant director of research from 1971 to 1972. In 1982, he became a fellow of the Australian Academy of Science and he was awarded the Marshall Medal from the Society for the Study of Fertility in 1993.

He contributed to various areas in reproductive biology and fertility and was known for the Whitten effect. In 2008, the Australian National University began building the Wes Whitten building, which is a generic animal accommodation facility for research

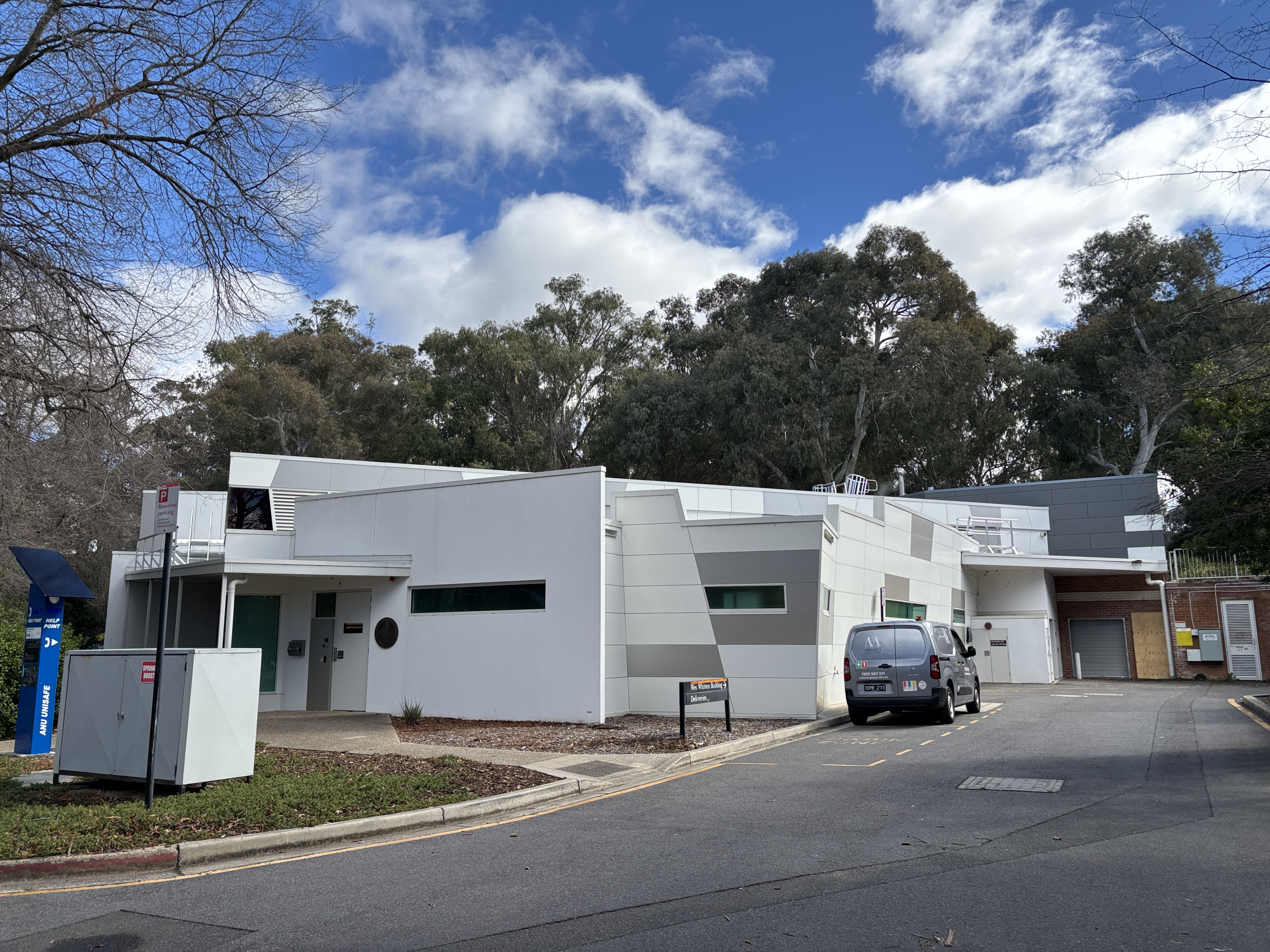
The Wes Whitten building at the ANU

His father was a Methodist minister (Alfred Giles Whitten) and his mother was Ethel Annie Whitten (née Cock). In 1941, he married Enid Elsbeth ('Beth') Cay Meredith. They had four children: Gregory, Mark, Jane, and Penelope. In 2002, he married J. Mary Taylor after the death of Beth in 1999.
