= Vandenbergh effect =

Hormonal phenomenon in mice

The Vandenbergh effect is a phenomenon reported by J.G. Vandenbergh et al. in 1975, in which an early induction of the first estrous cycle in prepubertal female mice occurs as a result of exposure to the pheromone-laden urine of a sexually mature (dominant) male mouse.

Physiologically, the exposure to male urine induces the release of GnRH, which provokes the first estrus. The Vandenbergh effect has also been seen with exposure to adult female mice. When an immature female mouse is exposed to the urine of mature female mouse, estrus is delayed in the prepubertal female. In this situation, GnRH is inhibited and therefore delays puberty in the juvenile female mouse.

The Vandenbergh effect is caused by pheromones found in a male's urine. The male does not have to be present for this effect to take place; the urine alone is sufficient. These pheromones are detected by the vomeronasal organ in the septum of the female's nose. This occurs because the female body will only take the step to begin puberty if there are available mates around. She will not waste energy on puberty if there is no possibility of finding a mate.

In addition to GnRH, exogenous estradiol has been implicated as having a role in the Vandenbergh effect. Utilizing tritium-labeled estradiol implanted in male mice, researchers have been able to trace the pathways the estradiol takes once transmitted to a female. The estradiol was found in a multitude of regions within the females and appeared to enter her circulation nasally and through the skin. Their findings suggested that some aspects of the Vandenbergh effect as well as the Bruce effect may be related to exogenous estradiol from males.

Additional studies have looked into the validity of estradiol's role in the Vandenbergh effect by means of exogenous estradiol placed in castrated rats. Castrated males were injected with either a control (oil) or estradiol in the oil vehicle. As expected, urinary androgens in the castrated males were below normal levels. Additionally, castration by itself rid the males of the capacity to induce growth of the uterus in prepubescent females or to disrupt implantation of the blastocyst in females that had previously been inseminated. However, when resupplied with estradiol, the castrated males regained the ability to induce uterine growth or halt blastocyst implantation. These studies further support estradiol's role in mediating the Vandenbergh effect (as well as the Bruce effect).

== See also ==
- Bruce effect
- Lee–Boot effect
- Whitten effect
