= Audrey Smith =

British cryobiologist (1915–1981)

- Born: 15 May 1915; India
- Died: 3 June 1981 (aged 66); London, England
- Education: King's College, London and Bedford College for Women
- Known for: Glycerol protecting red blood cells during freezing
- Scientific career
- Workplaces: King's College Hospital, National Institute for Medical Research

Audrey Ursula Smith (21 May 1915 – 3 June 1981) was a British cryobiologist, who discovered the use of glycerol to protect human red blood cells during freezing.

== Early life and education ==
Audrey Smith was born in India on 21 May 1915, and baptized at Chhindwara, India, one of two children of Alan Kenyon Smith, who worked for the Indian Civil Service, and his wife, Gertrude May Smith.

In 1935, she graduated from King's College, London with a first class honours BSc in general science, and in 1936, with a BSc from Bedford College for Women in physiology, again with first class honours.

== Career ==
Smith was house physician at King's College Hospital, in 1942, and clinical pathologist from 1943 to 1944. She was a pathologist at Epsom public health clinic from 1944 to 1945, and for the Nottingham Emergency Public Health Laboratory Service from 1945 to 1946.

From 1946 to 1970, she was a researcher at the National Institute for Medical Research. She worked initially with Sir Alan Parkes and Christopher Polge, with the goal of developing a viable technique for the cryopreservation of animal semen. This was unsuccessful. However, a subsequent freak accident—Smith dropped a bottle which broke and splattered a hot plate, and the resulting odour caused her to realize that the bottle had been mislabeled—led Smith to successfully experiment with glycerol in cryopreservation, and she discovered the first practical cryoprotectant molecule.

In 1969, Smith was a joint winner with Polge and Parkes of the John Scott Award of the city of Philadelphia for their method of low temperature preservation of living cells and tissues. Parkes thought that Smith and Polge should also have been included in his award of the Cameron Prize of the University of Edinburgh, but "the University authorities thought otherwise". Audrey Smith was awarded the Kamerlingh Onnes medal in 1973.

She was on the staff of the Royal National Orthopaedic Hospital at Stanmore, from 1970 to 1981.

Smith studied the use of glycerol to preserve blood during freezing, and also studied resuscitation of mammals from hypothermia.

== Death and legacy ==
Smith died in London on 3 June 1981.

According to her obituary in The New York Times, "her work in the development of techniques to protect frozen sperm cells from bulls has been credited with contributing to major advances in cattle breeding and animal husbandry".

One of the tunnel boring machines constructing the Thames Tideway Scheme tunnel is named 'Ursula' taking on Smith's middle name. Ursula is excavating a 5 kilometre section of tunnel between Kirtling Street in Battersea and Chambers Wharf in Hammersmith.

== Publications ==
- Polge, C.; A. Smith, and A. Parkes. "Revival of spermatozoa after vitrification and dehydration." Nature (London), 164:666, 1949.
- Smith, A. U. "Prevention of Haemolysis during Freezing and Thawing of Red Blood Cells." Lancet 2 (1950):910–911.
- Smith, A. U.; J. E. Lovelock; A. S. Parkes (12 June 1954). "Resuscitation of Hamsters after Supercooling or Partial Crystallization at Body Temperatures Below 0°C". Nature. 173 (4415): 1136–1137. Bibcode:1954Natur.173.1136S. doi:10.1038/1731136a0. ISSN 0028-0836. PMID 13165726. S2CID 4242031.
- Goldzveig, S. A.; Audrey U. Smith (28 May 1956). "A Simple Method for Reanimating Ice-cold Rats and Mice". The Journal of Physiology. 132 (2): 406–413. doi:10.1113/jphysiol.1956.sp005534. PMC 1363505. PMID 13320407.
- Smith, A. U. Biological Effects of Freezing and Supercooling, Williams and Wilkinns, London, 1961.
- Pegg, D. E. "The history and principles of cryopreservation." Semin Reprod Med, 20(1):5–13, 2002.
