= Hilda Margaret Bruce =

British zoologist (1903–1974)

Hilda Bruce
- Born: 5 April 1903
- Died: 2 November 1974 (aged 71)
- Education: King's College for Women
- Known for: Discovering the Bruce effect
- Scientific career
- Fields: Zoologist
- Workplaces: National Institute for Medical Research; Pharmaceutical Society

Hilda Margaret Bruce (5 April 1903 – 2 November 1974) was a British zoologist, best known for her discovery of the Bruce effect, a pheromonal behaviour observed in many rodent species. Her work on the control of fertility earned her the Oliver Bird Medal.

== Biography ==
Hilda Bruce was born on 5 April 1903. She was educated at St Leonards School. In 1923, she began her tertiary studies at King's College for Women, where she received a BSc in Household and Social Science, and another in Physiology. In 1928, Bruce joined the National Institute for Medical Research (NIMR) at Mount Vernon, Hampstead. Her early research was dedicated towards the understanding of Vitamin D; she also jointly published the first article describing the breeding characteristics of the golden hamster. In 1933, Bruce was employed by the Pharmaceutical Society, where she continued her research on Vitamin D. In 1941, she was appointed to set up the Cod Liver Oil (Poultry) Standardisation Laboratory. In 1944, she returned to the NIMR, where she formulated specialised diets for laboratory animals.

From the early 1950s, Bruce turned her attentions towards sexual behaviour in rodents, particularly the Whitten effect. In 1959, she published her discovery of what is now called the Bruce effect, the termination of pregnancy following exposure to the scent of an unfamiliar male. Bruce retired from the NIMR in 1963, but continued part-time research, variously on nutrients, development and pheromones, at the Department of Investigative Medicine in Cambridge. She continued work at the department until 1973. In her later years, Bruce largely used a wheelchair, having been afflicted with worsening rheumatoid arthritis since 1942.

== Bruce effect ==
Throughout the 1950s, Bruce studied sexual behaviour in laboratory mice, with a particular interest in oestrus synchronisation. In one experiment, she housed newly mated pregnant females with male mice that were not the father of the carried embryo. As a result, the rate of miscarriages increased, these females subsequently returning to oestrus and mating with the new male. No increased rate of miscarriages occurred when pregnant mice were paired with juvenile or castrated mice.

Her colleague Alan Parkes, who had recruited her to the NIMR in 1944, helped her to pursue the initial findings that eventually lead to this discovery.

== The National Institute for Medical Research ==
Following the isolation of pure vitamin D in 1931, Bruce worked in collaboration with Askew, Philpot and Webster in the Department of Biological Standards, determining the stability of the pure substance. At this time, Bruce was also working with Dr Callow in the Department of Physiology, Pharmacology and Biochemistry, determining the healing effect of vitamin D in rats with rickets.

== Publications ==
- Bourdillon, R. B.; Bruce, H. M. (1 January 1932). "The determination of vitamin D". Biochemical Journal. 26 (2): 506–521. doi:10.1042/bj0260506. PMC 1260932. PMID 16744851.
- Bruce, H. M. (1934). "Interaction of vitamin D and dietary factors in the healing of rickets in rats". Biochemical Journal. 28 (2): 512–516. doi:10.1042/bj0280512. PMC 1253223. PMID 16745413.
- Bruce, H. M.; Hindle, E. (July 1934). "The Golden Hamster, Cricetus (Mesocricetus) auratus Waterhouse. Notes on its Breeding and Growth". Proceedings of the Zoological Society of London. 104 (2): 361–366. doi:10.1111/j.1469-7998.1934.tb07757.x.
- Bruce, Hilda M. (1959). "An Exteroceptive Block to Pregnancy in the Mouse". Nature. 184 (4680): 105. doi:10.1038/184105a0. PMID 13805128.
- Bruce, H. M. (1965). "Effect of Castration on the Reproductive Pheromones of Male Mice". Reproduction. 10: 141–3. doi:10.1530/jrf.0.0100141. PMID 14337805.
