= Whitten effect =

Synchronisation of oestrus by male pheromones

The Whitten effect is stimulation, by male pheromones, of synchronous estrus in a female population.

Social signals, or social stimuli, have an effect on reproduction in all mammals. For certain female mice, the pheromones contained in the urine of male mice can be such stimuli, inducing synchronous estrus.

When the pheromones contained in the urine of male mice stimulate synchronous estrus in a population of female mice, it is known as the Whitten effect. This is a phenomenon observed by Wesley K. Whitten (1956, 1966, 1968), whereby male mouse pheromone-laden urine synchronizes the estrus cycle "among unisexually grouped females," and is an example of male-to-female pheromonal effects in mice, similar to the Bruce effect.

The Whitten effect occurs when a group of female mice are exposed to the urine produced by a male mouse. The male’s urine contains certain volatile, or airborne, pheromones that affect the hormonal processes of the females that control their reproductive status. A sexually mature and viable male must produce the urine, as the pheromones that produce the Whitten effect are dependent on male sex hormones such as testosterone.

The female mice do not require direct contact with the male’s urine to produce the Whitten effect, as the pheromone contained in the urine is airborne and therefore is taken up by the females through their olfactory system. The reproductive cycle of female mice in isolation is approximately 4 to 5 days, and the reproductive cycles of grouped females are often longer and more irregular. However, when grouped female mice are exposed to the pheromones contained in a male’s urine, the Whitten effect occurs, and the majority of the female mice will enter a new estrus cycle by the third day of exposure. However, there is little evidence for a similarly functioning vomeronasal, or olfactory, system (thought to be the sensory organ that initiates the Bruce, Vandenbergh, and Whitten effects) in humans. These differences, in putative stimulus and neural pathway (as well as species observed), stringently distinguishes the Whitten and McClintock effect, as the latter does not posit a role for male pheromones.

== See also ==
- Bruce effect
- Lee–Boot effect
- McClintock effect
- Vandenbergh effect

== Sources ==
- Whitten, W.K. (July 1956). "Modification of the oestrous cycle of the mouse by external stimuli associated with the male". Journal of Endocrinology. 13 (4): 399–404. doi:10.1677/joe.0.0130399. ISSN 0022-0795. PMID 13345955. Journal code: 0375363
- Whitten, WK (1957-12-21). "Effect of exteroceptive factors on the oestrous cycle of mice". Nature. 180 (4599): 1436. Bibcode:1957Natur.180.1436W. doi:10.1038/1801436a0. PMID 13493564. S2CID 4285117.
- Gangrade, BK; Dominic, CJ (August 1984). "Studies of the male-originating pheromones involved in the Whitten effect and Bruce effect in mice". Biology of Reproduction. 31 (1). Biology of Reproduction: 89–96. doi:10.1095/biolreprod31.1.89. PMID 6540606.
- Whitten, W.K. (1966). "Pheromones and mammalian reproduction". Advanced Reproductive Physiology (1): 155–177.
- Whitten, WK; Bronson, FH; Greenstein, JA (1968-08-09). "Estrus-inducing pheromone of male mice: transport by movement of air". Science. 161 (3841): 584–5. Bibcode:1968Sci...161..584W. doi:10.1126/science.161.3841.584. PMID 5690897. S2CID 12402072.
