= William Guthrie Gardiner =

British Businessman (born 1935)

William Guthrie Gardiner (died 7 November 1935) was a wealthy shipowner who was a generous benefactor to the University of Glasgow, endowing a number of chairs.

== Biography ==
He was born in Stirling in 1848 or 1849 and married Agnes in 1889. He died in Stirling in 1935 having lived much of his life in Govan. He had two brothers Frederick who became Sir Frederick Crombie Gardiner and James with whom established the company of James Gardiner & Co and made a great success from commercial shipping, owning a number of vessels although the business was not without its risks. The company was sold after the First World War generating a considerable fortune.

== University of Glasgow endowments ==
This wealth was subsequently used to greatly enrich the University of Glasgow. In 1898 they endowed a lectureship in Organic Chemistry in 1898 and later by endowing a number of Professorships which continue to this day. These include:

- Gardiner chairs of Music (1928)
- Gardiner Chair of Physiological Chemistry (1919) – renamed Chair of Biochemistry in 1958
- Gardiner Chair of Bacteriology (1919) – renamed Chair of Immunology in 1990
- Gardiner Chair Organic Chemistry (1919) – now the Gardiner Chair of Chemistry
- Gardiner Chair in the Pathology of Diseases of Infancy and Childhood (1928)

In 1938, the Gardiner Institute of Medicine was built the costs being met from their bequests.
