= Proceptive phase =

Courting phase of a reproductive relationship

In biology and sexology, the proceptive phase is the initial period in a relationship when organisms are "courting" each other, prior to the acceptive phase when copulation occurs. Behaviors that occur during the proceptive phase depend very much on the species, but may include visual displays, movements, sounds and odors.

The term proceptivity was introduced into general sexological use by Frank A. Beach in 1976 and refers to behavior enacted by a female to initiate, maintain, or escalate a sexual interaction. There are large species differences in proceptive behavior. The term has also been used to describe women's roles in human courtship, with a meaning very close to Beach's. A near synonym is proception.

The term proceptive phase refers to pre-consummatory, that is, pre-ejaculatory, behavior and focuses attention on the active role played by the female organism in creating, maintaining, and escalating the sexual interaction.

== See also ==
- Mating
