= Richard L. Doty =

Academic in psychology and otorhinolaryngology

Richard L. Doty is a professor of psychology and otorhinolaryngology at the University of Pennsylvania. He has also been the director of the University of Pennsylvania's Smell and Taste Center since 1980.

Doty is considered a world-renowned researcher in the field of olfactory functioning and dysfunction (anosmia). He is a pioneer in the development and validation of practical quantitative tests of olfaction, including the University of Pennsylvania Smell Identification Test (UPSIT).

== Career ==
Doty received his Bachelor of Science degree from Colorado State University in 1966. He was awarded a Master of Arts in experimental psychology with an emphasis in psychophysics from California State University San Jose in conjunction with NASA’s Ames Research Center in 1968. Doty earned his Ph.D. in Comparative Psychology and Zoology from Michigan State University in 1971.

He was a postdoctoral research fellow at the University of California, Berkeley from 1971 to 1973 in the field of behavioral endocrinology and was advised by Dr. Frank Beach. At the Monell Chemical Senses Center in Philadelphia, Pennsylvania, he was a Postdoctoral Fellow from 1973-1974 and then Director of the Human Olfaction Section from 1974-1978.

Doty created the University of Pennsylvania Smell Identification Test (UPSIT).

Doty has published over 400 papers in peer-reviewed journals related to olfactory and gustatory function, and is the editor or author of nine books, including Handbook of Olfaction and Gustation, Neurology of Olfaction with Christopher Hawkes, and The Great Pheromone Myth, among others.

== Awards ==
Doty has received multiple awards. In 1996, he received a James A. Shannon Award from the National Institutes of Health. Doty received the Olfactory Research Fund's Scientific Sense of Smell Award in 2000. In 2003 he received the William Osler Patient-Oriented Research Award from the University of Pennsylvania. 2004 saw Doty receive the Society of Cosmetic Chemists’ Service Award. A year later in 2005 he was recognized by the Association for Chemoreception Sciences with the Max Mozell Award for Outstanding Achievement in the Chemical Senses.

== Books ==
- Doty, Richard L., ed. (1976). Mammalian Olfaction, Reproductive Processes, and Behavior. New York: Academic Press. ISBN 978-0-12-221250-5.
- Laing, David G.; Doty, Richard L.; Breipohl, Winrich, eds. (1991). The Human Sense of Smell. Springer-Verlag. ISBN 978-3-540-53355-9.
- Doty, Richard L.; Müller-Schwarze, Dietland, eds. (1993). Chemical Signals in Vertebrates 6. New York, NY: Springer. ISBN 978-0-306-44250-6.
- Doty, Richard L., ed. (1995). Handbook of Olfaction and Gustation. New York: Dekker. ISBN 978-0-8247-9252-7.
  - Doty, Richard L., ed. (2003). Handbook of Olfaction and Gustation (2nd ed.). Taylor & Francis. ISBN 978-1-135-54308-2.
  - Doty, Richard L., ed. (2015). Handbook of Olfaction and Gustation (3rd ed.). Wiley. ISBN 978-1-118-13922-6.
- Hawkes, Christopher H.; Doty, Richard L. (2009). The Neurology of Olfaction. Cambridge: Cambridge University Press. ISBN 978-0-521-68216-9.
- Doty, Richard L. (2010). The Great Pheromone Myth. Johns Hopkins University Press. ISBN 978-0-801-89347-6.
- Hawkes, Christopher H.; Doty, Richard L. (2018). Smell and Taste Disorders. Cambridge University Press. ISBN 978-1-108-29792-9.
