= H. Clyde Wilson Jr. =

- Born: Houston Clyde Wilson; May 6, 1926; Proctor, Texas, U.S.
- Died: March 30, 2010 (aged 83); Columbia, Missouri, U.S.
- Education: Baylor University; Texas A&M; University of Texas; University of California, Los Angeles
- Known for: Anthropology; Mayor of Columbia Missouri
- Awards: MU Peace Studies Professor; Fellow American Anthropological Association; Member of Sigma Xi
- Scientific career
- Fields: Anthropology
- Workplaces: University of Missouri

H. Clyde Wilson Jr. (May 6, 1926 – March 30, 2010) was a professor of anthropology at the University of Missouri. He was a fellow of American Anthropological Association and member of Sigma Xi. He was politically active running and winning four terms on the city council of Columbia, Missouri, and one term as mayor. He received the MU Peace Studies Professor of the Year Award for 1998.

== Biography ==
=== Intellectual ===
In 1944, Wilson enlisted in the U.S. Navy where he attended officer candidate school. After World War II, he attended Baylor University followed by Texas A&M University, where he received a degree in mathematics in 1949. He next attended the University of Texas and received a master's degree in anthropology. He then attended the University of Michigan as a graduate student and later received a Ph.D. from University of California, Los Angeles in 1961. After World War II, the GI Bill and his work for the Texas Highway Department, as an economic planner for the Jicarilla Apache Tribe in New Mexico, and as an attendant in a psychiatric hospital, helped to support his education. He was also involved in the early stages of testing of the Salk polio vaccine. In 1961, he joined the department of anthropology at the University of Missouri. He was a fellow of the American Anthropological Association and Sigma Xi. He was the first researcher to point out methodological flaws in studies reporting menstrual synchrony among women.

=== Political ===
He was politically active as a member of the American Civil Liberties Union and the National Association for the Advancement of Colored People. He campaigned for Congress in 1970 during the Vietnam War. Starting in 1971, he was a four-time city council member of Columbia, Missouri. He was mayor of Columbia Missouri for one two-year term in 1979. He received the MU Peace Studies Professor of the Year Award for 1998. He was involved early on in civil rights issues in Missouri, land use conservation, and in the conception of Katy Trail State Park. His political papers from 1962 to 1972 are located at the State Historical Society of Missouri.

=== Personal ===
On May 6, 1926, he was born in Proctor, Texas, to Houston Clyde Wilson Sr. and Lena B. Purvis Wilson. On August 24, 1957, he married Betty K. Wilson, in Ann Arbor, Michigan. He had four sons, Thomas H. Wilson, David A. Wilson, James A. Wilson and Benjamin C. Wilson and one daughter, Anne K. Ferrell. He died at home in Columbia, Missouri, after a long illness.
