= Bruce effect =

Effect of unfamiliar male scent on pregnant female rodents

The Bruce effect, or pregnancy block, is the tendency for female rodents to terminate their pregnancies following exposure to the scent of an unfamiliar male. The effect was first noted in 1959 by Hilda M. Bruce, and has primarily been studied in laboratory mice (Mus musculus). In mice, pregnancy can only be terminated prior to embryo implantation, but other species will interrupt even a late-term pregnancy.

The Bruce effect is also observed in deer-mice, meadow voles, collared lemmings, and it has also been proposed, but not confirmed, in other non-rodent species such as lions and geladas.

== Discovery ==
In an experiment published in 1959, zoologist Hilda Bruce of the National Institute for Medical Research in London housed pregnant mice with male mice that were not the father of the carried embryo. As a result, the rate of miscarriages increased, followed by mating with the new male. No increased rate of miscarriages occurred when pregnant mice were paired with castrated or juvenile male mice. The effect remained when the male mice were kept out of sight or hearing of the females. This suggested that females were distinguishing the males by smell. To test this hypothesis, Bruce and her colleague Alan Parkes recruited perfumers to smell pieces of cloth from the mouse cages. The perfumers could distinguish the smells of different mouse strains.

== Mechanisms of action ==
=== Detection of pheromones ===
The vomeronasal system serves as a "vascular pump" that, stimulated by the presence of a novel male, actively draws in substances. Male mouse urine contains MHC class I peptides that bind to receptors in the female's vomeronasal organ, a mucus-filled structure in the nasal septum. These chemical signals, which are specific to each male, are learned by the female during mating, or shortly after. The hormone vasopressin is crucial in coupling a chemosensory cue with an appropriate physiological response. When the vasopressin 1b receptor gene is knocked out in females, the presence of an unfamiliar male does not trigger pregnancy disruption.

=== Recognizing familiar males ===
Exposure to a male's urinal pheromones will activate a neuroendocrine pathway leading to pregnancy failure. However, if the pheromones correspond with those memorized by the female (usually the male mating partner), a release of noradrenaline will lower the receptivity of the accessory olfactory bulb to these pheromones. The pregnancy disruption will, thus, be averted. This role for noradrenaline has recently been called into question. The hormone oxytocin is also important in this social memory process. Females treated with an oxytocin antagonist are unable to recognize the urinary scent of their mate, and will terminate pregnancy when exposed to any male, known or unknown.

=== Neuroendocrine pathway ===
The activation of vomeronasal neuron receptors by male pheromones triggers a complex neuroendocrine pathway. The pheromonal information travels via nerves to the accessory olfactory bulb, and then to the corticomedial amygdala, accessory olfactory tract, and stria terminalis. These areas stimulate the hypothalamus to increase the release of dopamine, which thus prevents the secretion of prolactin from the anterior pituitary. In the absence of prolactin, an essential hormone for maintaining the corpus luteum, luteolysis takes place. As the corpus luteum can no longer release progesterone, the uterus remains unprimed for embryo implantation, and the pregnancy fails.

=== Role of estrogens ===
Androgens and estrogens, particularly estradiol (E2), are also crucial chemosignals regulating the Bruce effect. However, they are believed to act via a separate pathway to that discussed above. Small steroid molecules such as E2 can enter the bloodstream directly via nasal ingestion and travel to the uterus, which has a high density of suitable receptors. Normally, E2 is essential in preparing both the blastocyst and uterus for implantation. However, excessive E2 will prevent implantation from taking place. Castrated males are incapable of terminating female pregnancies, except when castrated males are given testosterone. estradiol, a metabolic product of testosterone, is known to disrupt pregnancy in females, and is present in male urine.

=== Timing ===
The incidence of the Bruce effect depends on the timing of pheromone exposure. Post-mating, females experience twice-daily surges of prolactin. Pregnancy is only terminated if exposure to novel male scent coincides with two prolactin surges, one of these occurring in a daylight period.

== Evolutionary benefits ==
In order to have evolved and persisted in the population, the Bruce effect must afford individuals a fitness advantage. The possible advantages of pregnancy block are widely debated.

=== Males ===
When given the opportunity, male mice tend to direct their urine in the female's direction. This allows males to improve their fitness success by "sabotaging" the pregnancy of a male competitor, and more quickly returning the female to estrus. The Bruce effect can also aid in maintaining social status, with dominant males leaving more urinal scent markings, and so blocking the pregnancies initiated by subordinate males.

=== Females ===
Females can control their likelihood of terminating pregnancy by pursuing or avoiding novel male contact during their most susceptible periods. In this way, females can exert a post-copulatory mate choice, reserving their reproductive resources for the highest-quality male. Certainly, females are more likely to seek proximity to dominant males. In many rodent species, males kill unrelated young; pregnancy block may avoid the wasted investment of gestating offspring likely to be killed at birth. The Bruce effect is most common in polygynous rodent species, for which the risk of infanticide is highest.

== See also ==
- Coolidge effect
- Lee–Boot effect
- Vandenbergh effect
- Whitten effect
