= Menstrual synchrony =

Idea that menstrual cycles synchronise from proximity

The menstrual synchrony theory of psychologist Martha McClintock proposes that living together would tend to synchronize the menstrual cycles of women. Although no scientific evidence has been found to support this theory, the (supposed) phenomenon was dubbed "the McClintock effect" or the "Wellesley effect" (named for the college where it reportedly occurred). McClintock's paper in Nature proposed that social interaction could affect the menstrual cycle, but her study had methodological flaws and other published studies failed to find synchrony.

The proposed mechanisms have also received scientific criticism. Reviews in 2006 and 2013 concluded that menstrual synchrony likely does not exist.

== Overview ==
=== Original study by Martha McClintock ===
Martha McClintock published the first study on menstrual synchrony among women living together in dormitories at Wellesley College, a women's liberal arts college in Massachusetts, US.

=== Proposed causes ===
McClintock hypothesized that pheromones could cause menstrual cycle synchronization. However, other mechanisms have been proposed, most prominently synchronization with lunar phases.

=== Efforts to replicate McClintock's results ===
No scientific evidence supports the lunar hypothesis, and doubt has been cast on pheromone mechanisms.

After the initial studies reporting menstrual synchrony began to appear in the scientific literature, other researchers began reporting the failure to find menstrual synchrony.

These studies were followed by critiques of the methods used in early studies, which argued that biases in the methods used produced menstrual synchrony as an artifact.

=== Terminology ===
The term synchrony has been argued to be misleading because no study has ever found that menstrual cycles become strictly concordant, nevertheless menstrual synchrony is used to refer the phenomenon of menstrual cycle onsets becoming closer to each other over time.

=== Status of the hypothesis ===
In a 2013 systematic review of menstrual synchrony, Harris and Vitzthum concluded, "In light of the lack of empirical evidence for MS [menstrual synchrony] sensu stricto, it seems there should be more widespread doubt than acceptance of this hypothesis" (pp. 238–239).

The experience of synchrony may be the result of the mathematical fact that menstrual cycles of different frequencies repeatedly converge and diverge over time and not due to a process of synchronization, and the probability of encountering such overlaps by chance is high.

=== Evolutionary perspective ===
Researchers are divided on whether menstrual synchrony would be adaptive. McClintock has suggested that menstrual synchrony may not be adaptive but rather epiphenomenal, lacking any biological function. Among those who postulate an adaptive function, one argument is that menstrual synchrony is only a particular aspect of the much more general phenomenon of reproductive synchrony, an occurrence familiar to ecologists studying animal populations in the wild. Whether seasonal, tidal, or lunar, reproductive synchrony is a relatively common mechanism through which co-cycling females can increase the number of males included in the local breeding system.

Conversely, it has been argued that if there are too many females cycling together, they would be competing for the highest quality males, forcing female–female competition for high quality mates and thereby lowering fitness. In such cases, selection should favor avoiding synchrony. Divergent climate regimes differentiating Neanderthal reproductive strategies from those of modern Homo sapiens have recently been analysed in these terms.

Turning to the evolutionary past, a possible adaptive basis for the biological capacity would be reproductive levelling: among primates, synchronising to any natural clock makes it difficult for an alpha male to monopolise fertile sex with multiple females. This would be consistent with the striking gender egalitarianism of extant non-storage hunter-gatherer societies. When early Pleistocene hominids in Africa were attempting to survive by robbing big cats of their kills, according to some evolutionary scientists, it may have been adaptive to restrict overnight journeys—including sexual liaisons—to times when there was a moon in the sky.

=== Media attention ===
The question of whether those who live together do in fact synchronize their menstrual cycles has also received attention in the popular media.

=== Traditional myth and ritual ===
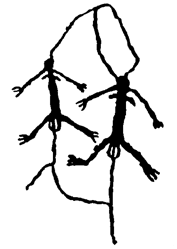
Two women dancing. Rock engraving from the Upper Yule River, Pilbara, Western Australia.

The idea that menstruation is—or ideally ought to be—in harmony with wider cosmic rhythms is one of the most tenacious ideas central to the myths and rituals of traditional communities across the world.

String was first made by the two Wawalik Sisters at Mudawa, near Buckingham Bay.... The sisters sat down, looking at each other, with their feet out and legs apart, and both menstruated... Each one made a loop of the other one's menstrual blood, after which they put the string loops around their necks.

The !Kung (or Ju|'hoansi) hunter-gatherers of the Kalahari "believe ... that if a woman sees traces of menstrual blood on another woman's leg or even is told that another woman has started her period, she will begin menstruating as well". Among the Yurok people of northwestern California, according to one ethnographic study, "all of a household's fertile women who were not pregnant menstruated at the same time...".

She said that she had been instructed in the menstrual laws by her maternal aunts and grandmother, who in their times were well-known, conservative Yurok women.... the young woman said that in old-time village life all of a household's fertile women who were not pregnant menstruated at the same time, a time dictated by the moon; that these women practised bathing rituals together at this time... If a woman got out of synchronization with the moon and with the other women of the household, she could 'get back in by sitting in the moonlight and talking to the moon, asking it to balance her'.

== Scientific details ==
The phenomenon of menstrual synchrony is the closeness in time of the menstrual cycle onsets of two or more women. The phenomenon is not synchronization in the strict sense of concordance of menstrual cycle onsets but the term menstrual synchrony is still used perhaps misleadingly. As an undergraduate, Martha McClintock published the first study on menstrual synchrony; her report detailed how many days elapsed between menstrual offset of undergraduate women living in a dormitory in Wellesley College. Since then, there have been attempts to replicate her findings and to determine the conditions under which synchrony occurs, if it exists. Her work was followed up by studies reporting menstrual synchrony and by other studies that failed to find synchrony.

Thus, a number of studies were published from the 1980s to the mid 2000s, which attempted to replicate menstrual synchrony in college women, determine the conditions under which menstrual synchrony occurred, and to address methodological issues that were raised as these studies were published. The rest of this section discusses these studies in chronological order, briefly presenting their findings and main conclusions grouped by decade followed by general methodological issues in menstrual synchrony research.

=== Studies ===
==== 1970s ====
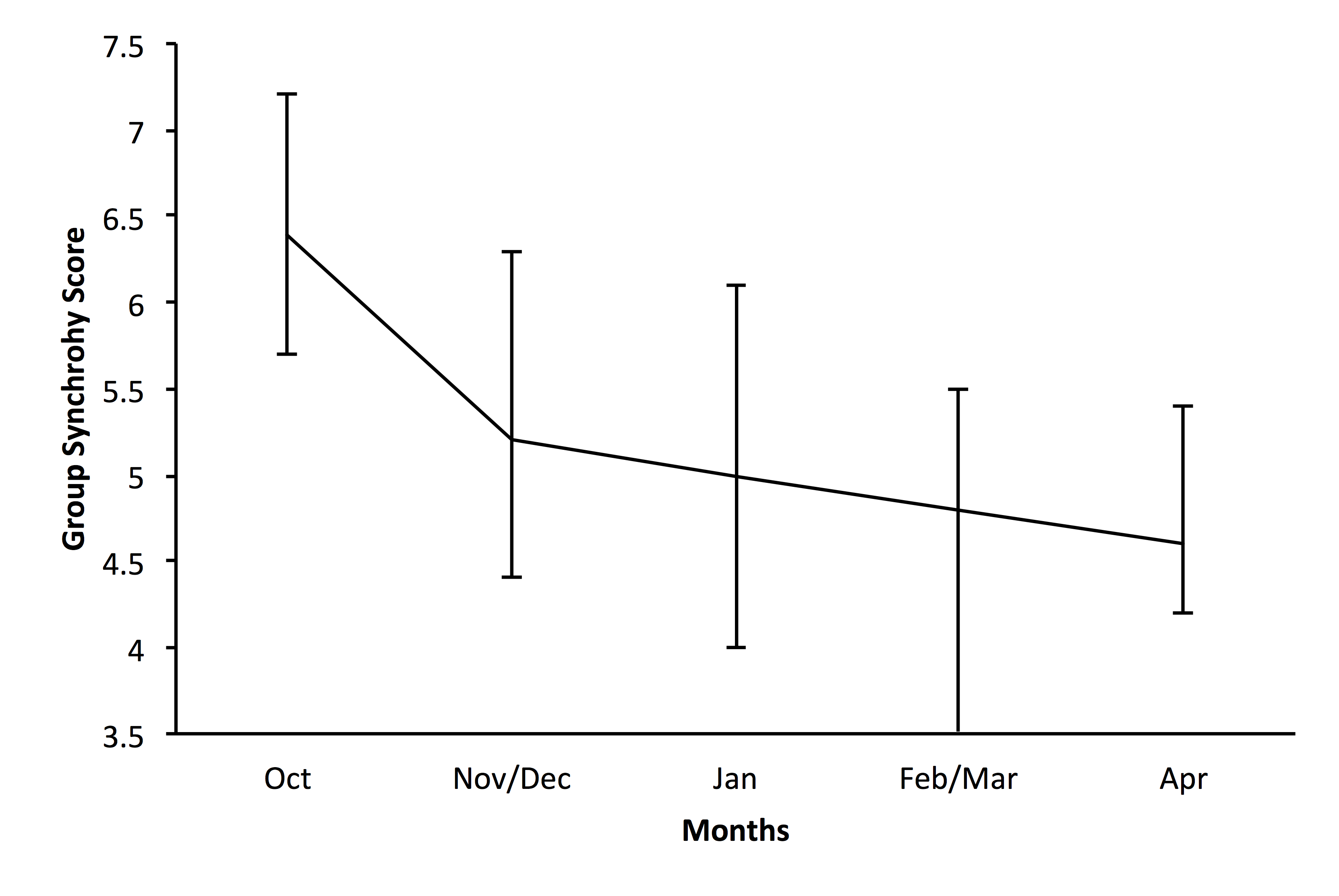
Group synchrony scores over time with 99% confidence intervals from McClintock's study (an approximation of Fig 1). In October, the mean onset difference was about 6.5 days and by the end of the study the mean onset difference decreased by almost 2 days.

McClintock's study consisted of 135 female college students who were 17 to 22 years old at the time of the study. They were all residents of a single dormitory, which had four main corridors. The women were asked when their last and second to last menstrual period had started three times during the academic year (which ranged from September to April). They also were asked who (other women in the dormitory) they associated with most and how often each week they associated with males. From these data, McClintock placed women into pairs of close friends and roommates and she also placed them into groups of friends ranging in size from 5 to 10 women. She reported statistically significant synchrony for both her pairwise sorting of women and her group sorting of women. That is, whether women were placed into pairs of close friends and roommates or whether they were placed into larger groups of friends, she reported that they synchronized their menstrual cycles. She also reported that the more often women associated with males, the shorter their menstrual cycles were. She speculated that this may be a pheromone effect paralleling the Whitten effect in mice but that it could not explain menstrual synchrony among women. Finally, she speculated that there could be a pheromone mechanism of menstrual synchrony similar to the Lee-Boot effect in mice.

==== 1980s ====
Graham and McGrew were the first researchers to attempt to replicate McClintock's study. There were 79 women living in halls of residence or apartments on the campus of a college in Scotland. The women were 17 to 21 years old at the time of the study and the procedures followed were similar to those used in McClintock's study. She partially replicated McClintock's study reporting that close friends but not neighbors synchronized their cycles. Unlike in McClintock's study, close friends did not synchronize in groups. They considered a pheromone mechanism a possible explanation of synchrony, but noted that if pheromones were the cause, neighbors should have synchronized as well. They concluded that the mechanism of synchrony remains unknown, but emotional attachment may play a role.

Quadagno et al. conducted the second replication of McClintock's study. There were 85 women living in dormitories, sorority houses, and apartments who attended a large midwestern university in the United States. Their study used methods similar to McClintock's study except in addition to two women living together, there were also groups of three and four women living together. They reported that the women synchronized their menstrual cycles and concluded that pheromones may have played a role in synchronization.

Jarett's study was the third to attempt to replicate McClintock's original study using college roommates. There were 144 women who attended two colleges. The women were 17 to 22 years old and the procedures followed were similar to McClintock's study except only pairs of roommates were used. She reported that the women did not synchronize. Jarett concluded that whether menstrual synchrony occurs in a group of women may depend on the variability of their menstrual cycles. She conjectured that the reason the women in her study did not synchronize their menstrual cycles was because they happened to have longer and more irregular menstrual cycles than in McClintock's original study.

==== 1990s ====
Wilson, Kiefhabe, and Gravel conducted two studies with college women. The first study consisted of 132 women who were members of a sorority or roommates of members at the University of Missouri. The women were 18 to 22 years of age and the study aimed to replicate McClintock's original study. However, instead of asking women to recall when their last and next to last menstrual onsets occurred, one of the researchers visited the sorority daily to record the occurrence of menstrual onsets and to collect other biographical data. The second study consisted of 24 women living in a cooperative house near the University of Missouri. The women were 18 to 31 years of age. One of the researchers visited the house three times a week recording menstrual onset and collecting more extensive biographical and psychological test data than in the first study. They found no menstrual synchrony in either study. They considered the possibility that women with irregular cycles may reduce the likelihood of detecting synchrony, so they re-analyzed their data after they removed women with irregular cycles, but again there was no statistically significant effect of synchrony. They concluded that "It is clear no meaningful process of selection or exclusion of pairs can produce a significant level of menstrual synchrony in our samples... Therefore, whether or not menstrual synchrony occurs among women who spend time together must remain a hypothesis requiring further investigation" (p. 358).

Weller and Weller conducted a study with 20 lesbian couples. They hypothesized that contact within couples should be maximal and contact with men minimal compared to previous studies, which should maximize the likelihood of detecting synchrony. The women ranged in age between 19 and 34 years of age. This was the first study that did not explicitly use college women, but instead the women were recruited at a bar by a research assistant who was a proprietor of a bar. Unlike previous studies, they only asked the women for the date of their last menstrual onset. They then assumed that all the women had menstrual cycles that were exactly 28 days long. Based on this assumption and one menstrual onset for each woman in a couple, they calculated the degree of synchrony. They reported that more than half of the couples had synchronized within a two-day timespan of each other.

Trevathan, Burleson, and Gregory also conducted a study with 29 lesbian couples (22 to 48 years of age), but they incorporated the methodological critique of Wilson into the design of their study. In particular, Wilson emphasized the importance of using actual menstrual cycle lengths with their inherent variability. The lesbian couples were drawn from a larger sample of women who had kept daily records of their menstrual cycles for three months and who had participated in a previous study. They found no evidence of synchrony. They discussed several factors that could have prevented synchrony in their study but they strongly suggested that menstrual synchrony may not be a real phenomenon because of the methodological issues Wilson raised and because menstrual synchrony appears to lack adaptive significance.

In addition to the study they conducted with lesbian couples, Weller and Weller conducted a number of other studies on menstrual synchrony during the 1990s. In most studies they reported finding menstrual synchrony, but in some studies they did not find synchrony. In a methodological review article in 1997, they refined their approach to measuring to better handle the problem of cycle variability. Specifically, they concluded that several menstrual cycles should be measured from each woman and that the longest average cycle length in a pair or group of women should be the basis for calculating the expected cycle onset difference. Thus, their research falls into the pre-1997 methodology and post-1997 methodology.

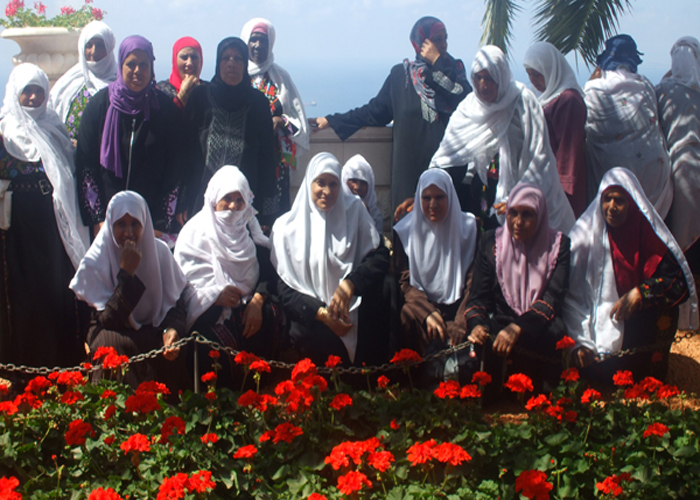
Bedouin women from Israel

In 1997, Weller and Weller published one of the first studies to investigate when menstrual synchrony occurs in complete families. Their study was conducted in Bedouin villages in northern Israel. Twenty seven families, which had from two to seven sisters 13 years or older and collected data on menstrual cycle onsets over a three-month period. Using the methods of, they reported menstrual synchrony occurred for the first two months, but not for the third month for roommate sisters, close friend roommates, and for families as a whole.

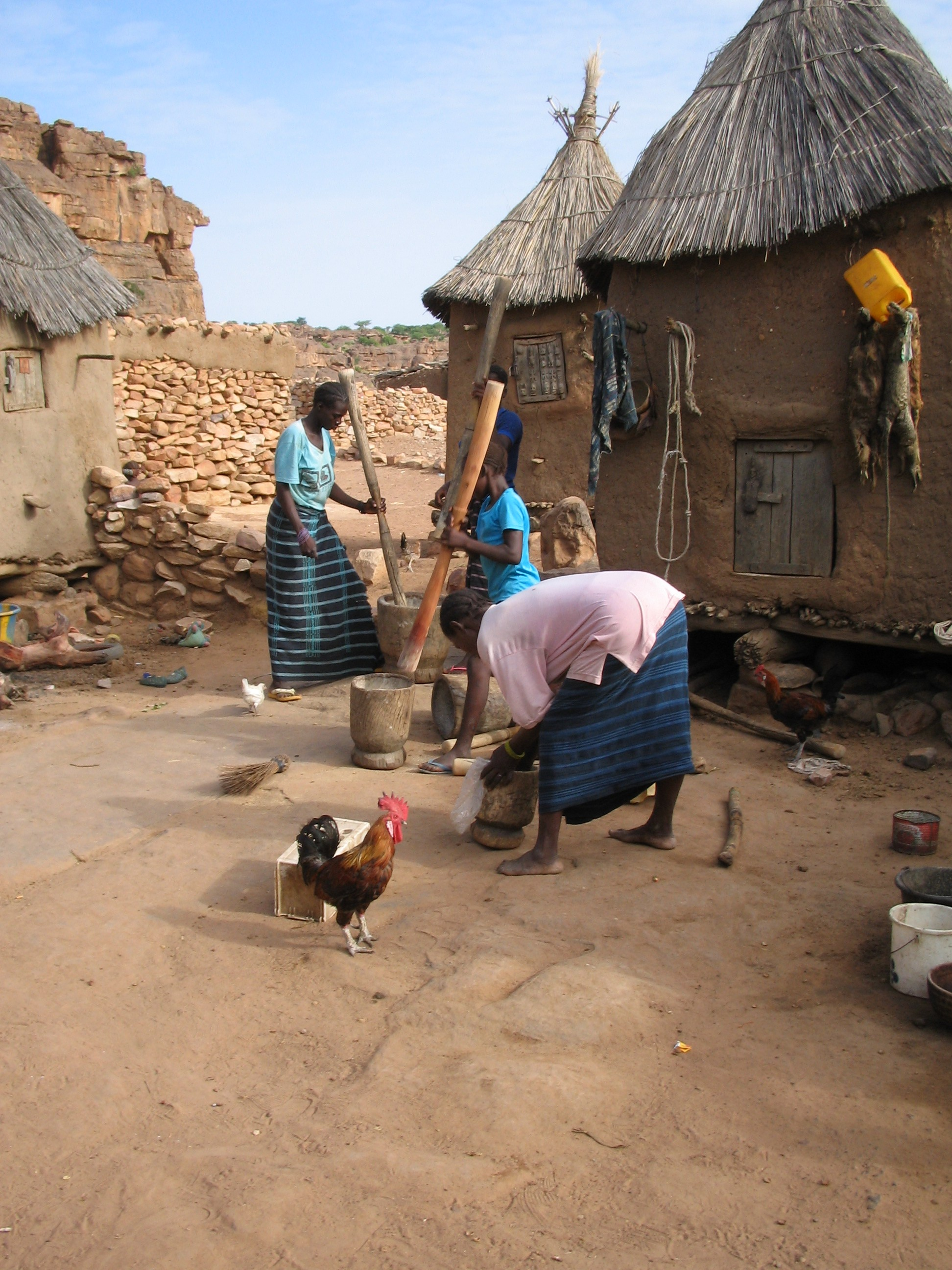
Dogon women pounding millet

Strassmann investigated whether menstrual synchrony occurred in a natural fertility population of Dogon village women. Her study consisted of 122 Dogon women with an average lifetime fertility rate of 8.6 ± .3 live births per woman. Their median cycle length was 30 days, which is indistinguishable from western women. In analyzing whether menstrual synchrony occurs among Dogon women, she was aware of Wilson's methodological criticisms of previous studies and aware that menstrual synchrony isn't synchrony per se, but rather the closeness of menstruation among women. She used Cox regression to determine whether the likelihood of menstruating was influenced by other women. She considered the levels of all the women in the village, all the women in the same lineage, and all the women in the same economic unit (i.e., they worked together). She found no significant relationship at any level, which means that there was no evidence of synchronization. She concluded that this result undermined the view that menstrual synchrony is adaptive and the view held by many anthropologists at the time that menstrual synchrony occurred in preindustrial societies.

==== 2000s ====
Menstrual synchrony research declined after the published critiques in the 1990s and around the turn of the century. The two studies published during this decade incorporated the methodological critiques into their designs and used more appropriate statistical methods.

Yang and Schank conducted the largest study to date with 186 Chinese college women. Ninety three of the women lived in 13 dorm rooms, 5 to 8 women per room. The other ninety three women lived in 16 dorm rooms, 4 to 8 women per room for a total of 29 rooms. The women were given notebooks to record the onset of each of their cycles and they collected data for over a year for most of the women.

Following the statistical critiques of Schank, they argued that circular statistics were required to analyze periodic data for the existence of synchrony. However, menstrual cycles are variable in frequency (e.g., 28 or 31 day cycles) and in length. They pointed out that there are no statistical methods for analyzing messy data like this, so they developed Monte Carlo methods for detecting synchrony.

They found that in 9 of the 29 groups, women's cycles converged for one cycle closer than expected by chance, but then they diverged again. Upon further analysis, they found that for women with the cycle variability reported in this study, on average 10 out of 29 groups of women would show this pattern of convergence followed by divergence. They concluded that finding 9 out of 29 groups with convergence and then divergence is about what would be expected by chance and concluded that there was no evidence the women in this study synchronized their menstrual cycles.

Ziomkiewicz conducted a study with 99 Polish college women living in two dormitories. Thirty six of the women lived in 18 double rooms and sixty three lived in 21 triple rooms. Women recorded their menstrual cycle onsets on menstrual calendars provided to them and 181 days' worth of menstrual cycle data were collected. The mean menstrual cycle length was 30.5 days (SD = 4.56).

Based on the mean cycle length of the women in this study, the expected difference by chance in menstrual cycle onset was approximately 7.5 days. The mean difference in cycle onset was calculated for the beginning, middle, and end of the study for the pairs and triples of women. Ziomkiewicz found no statistically significant difference from the 7.5 day expected difference at either the beginning, middle, or end of the study. She concluded that there was no evidence of menstrual synchrony.

==== Methodological issues ====
===== Initial onset differences =====
H. Clyde Wilson argued that at the start of any menstrual synchrony study, the minimum cycle onset difference must be calculated by using two onset differences from each woman in a group. For example, suppose two women have exactly 28-day cycles. The greatest distance that one cycle onset can be from another is 14 days. Suppose the first two onsets for woman A are July 1 and July 29 and for woman B, they are July 24 and August 21. If only the first two recorded onsets of A and B are compared, the difference between onsets is 23 days, which is greater than the 14 days that can actually occur. Wilson argued that McClintock did not correctly calculate the initial onset difference among women and concluded that the initial onset difference among women in a group was biased towards asynchrony.

Yang and Schank followed up on this point by using computer simulations to estimate the average onset difference that would occur by among women with variable cycle lengths and a mean cycle length of 29.5 days reported by McClintock. They reported that the average onset difference by chance among women with cycle characteristics reported by McClintock was about 5 days. They also calculated the expected onset difference at the beginning of the study using McClintock's method for calculating initial cycle onset differences. They reported that the initial cycle onset difference for the groups of women using McClintock's method was about 6.5 days. McClintock reported that groups of women had an initial cycle onset difference at the beginning of her study of about 6.5 days and then subsequently synchronized to an average difference of a little less than 5 days. Yang and Schank point out that since the expected cycle onset differences they calculated were so close to the differences reported by McClintock, that there may be no statistical difference. They concluded that If their analysis is correct, it implies that synchrony did not occur in McClintock's original study.

=== Hypothesized mechanisms of synchronization ===
==== Lunar synchronization ====
Cutler and Law hypothesized that menstrual synchrony is caused by menstrual cycles synchronizing with lunar phases. However, neither of them agree on what phase of the lunar cycle menstrual cycles synchronize with. Cutler hypothesizes the synchronization with the full moon and Law with the new moon. Neither offer hypotheses regarding how lunar phases cause menstrual synchrony and neither are consistent with previous studies that found no relationship between menstrual cycles and lunar cycles. More recently, Strassmann investigated menstrual synchrony among Dogon village women. The women were outdoors most nights and did not have electrical lighting. She hypothesized that Dogon women would be ideal for detecting a lunar influence on menstrual cycles, but she found no relationship.

==== Social affiliation ====
Jarett hypothesized that women who were more affiliative and concerned with how others viewed them would synchronize more. In her study, however, women with low affiliation scores were associated with greater synchrony. She found that women with a need for social recognition and approval from others were associated with synchrony, which is partially consistent with her hypothesis. Nevertheless, the group of women she studied did not synchronize their menstrual cycles.

==== Coupled oscillators ====
When McClintock published her study on menstrual synchrony, she speculated that pheromones may cause menstrual synchrony. In a study on Norway rats, McClintock proposed and tested a coupled oscillator hypothesis (see section on rats below). The coupled-oscillator hypothesis proposed estrous cycles in rats were cause by two, estrous phase dependent pheromones that mutually modulated the length of cycles in a group and thereby causing synchrony.

This idea was extended to humans in a study by Stern and McClintock. They investigated whether a coupled-oscillator mechanism first reported for Norway rats (see section below on rats) could also exist in humans. The coupled-oscillator hypothesis in humans proposed that human females release and receive pheromones that regulate the length of their menstrual cycles. This was assumed to occur without consciously detecting any odor. The study was conducted by collecting compounds from axillae (underarms) of donor women at prescribed phases during their menstrual cycles (i.e., the follicular phase, ovulatory phase, and luteal phase), and applying the compounds daily under the noses of recipient women. In order to collect the axillary compounds, the donor women wore cotton pads under their arms for at least 8 hours, and then the pads were cut into smaller squares, frozen to preserve the scent, and readied for distribution to the recipients. The recipients were split into two groups, and were exposed to the compounds via application of the thawed axillary pad under their noses daily.

The researchers concluded that odorless compounds collected from women during the late follicular phase of their menstrual cycles triggered hormonal events that shortened the menstrual cycles of the recipient women, and that odorless compounds collected from women during the time of ovulation triggered a hormonal event in the recipient women that lengthened their menstrual cycles. Stern and McClintock concluded that these findings "proved the existence of human pheromones" as well as illustrated manipulation of the human menstrual cycle.

Researchers pointed out several flaws in their study. Whitten's main critiques was with their using only their first cycles as a control for the subsequent conditions. He argued that this eliminated all within-subject variance. Control conditions should have been run between each experimental condition and not just at the beginning of the study. He was also skeptical about whether the coupled-oscillator model from rat research could be applied to humans.

=== Perception and awareness of synchrony ===
Arden and Dye investigated women's awareness and perception of menstrual synchrony. Their study consisted of 122 women (students and staff) at Leeds University. A four-page questionnaire was sent to each participant. After providing personal details, they were given a description of menstrual synchrony: "Menstrual synchrony occurs when two or more women, who spend time with each other, have their periods at approximately the same time" (p. 257). After reading the description they were asked whether they were aware of menstrual synchrony and whether they had experienced it. They were then asked details about their experience of synchrony such as how many times they experienced and how long it lasted.

They found that 84% of the women were aware of the phenomenon of menstrual synchrony and 70% reported the personal experience of synchrony. The experience of synchrony occurred most commonly with close friends followed by roommates. There was considerable variation in the reported time spent together before synchrony occurred ranging from zero to four weeks to 12 months or more. The most common time was 12 months or more. The duration of menstrual synchrony also was highly variable with responses ranging from one to two months to 12 months or more. They conclude that "Whether or not future research concludes that menstrual synchrony is an objective phenomenon, subjective experiences, which are apparently widespread, need to be given careful consideration." (p. 265)

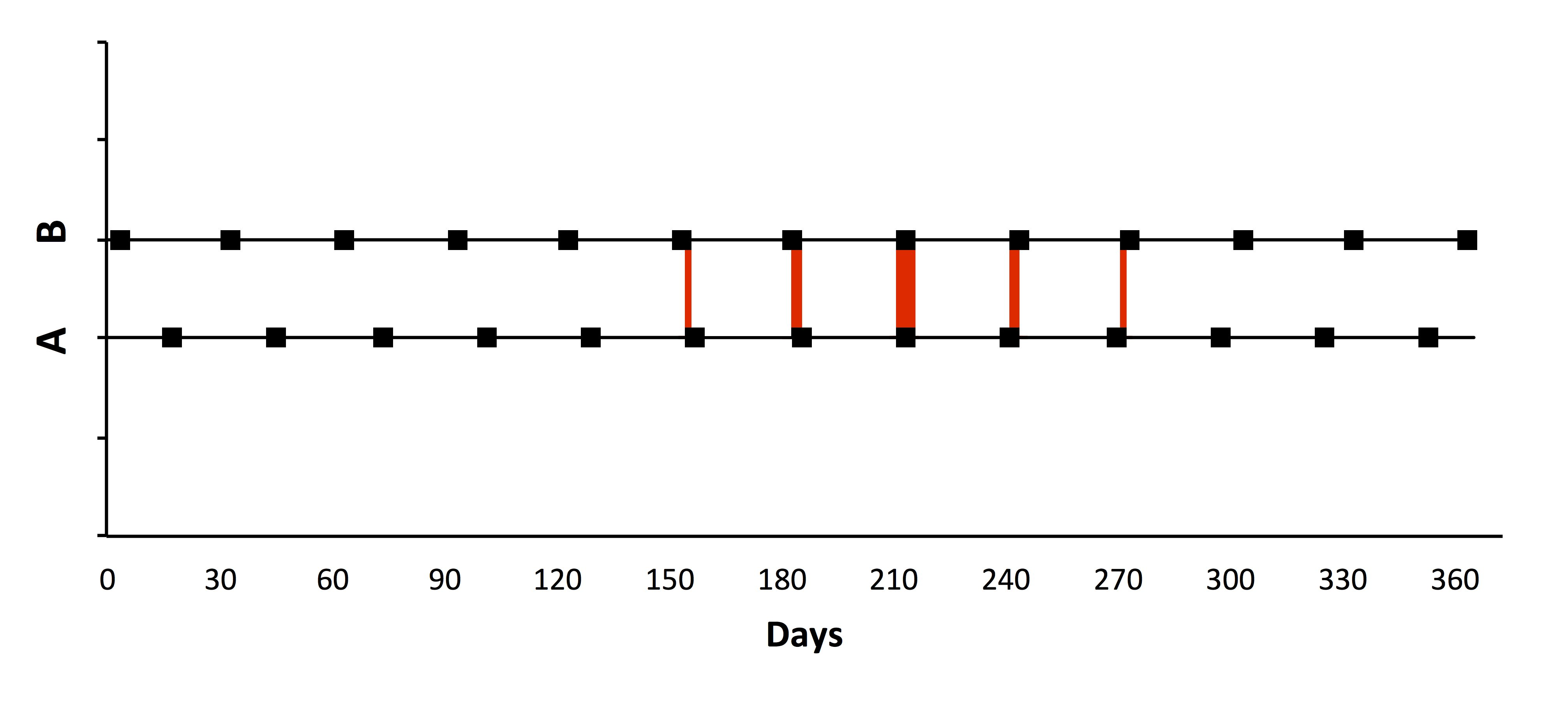
An illustration of menstrual cycle convergence and divergence as described in Yang and Schank. For illustration, A and B have menses duration of four days each. A has 28-day cycles and B has 30-day cycles. The first onset of B that appears is 14 days earlier than A's. Red vertical lines indicate menses overlap or meet. In this example, cycles gradually converge and A and B may "experience" synchrony for five months.

Both Wilson and Arden and Dye pointed out that menstrual synchrony can occur by chance when there is menstrual cycle variability. Yang and Schank argued that when there is cycle variability (i.e., either women have irregular cycles, have cycles of different frequencies, or both), most women will have the opportunity to experience synchrony even though it is a result of cycle variability and not a result of a mechanism such as the exchange of pheromones. For example, consider two women A and B. Suppose A has menstrual cycles that are 28 days long and B has cycles that are 30 days long. Suppose further that when A and B become close friends, B has a cycle onset 14 days before A's next onset. The next time both of them have menstrual cycle onsets, B will have a cycle onset 12 days before A. B will continue to gain two days on A until their onsets coincide, then their cycles will begin to diverge again. The cycles of A and B will repeatedly converge and diverge creating the appearance of synchrony during convergence. This is a mathematical property of cycles of different frequencies and not due to the interaction of A and B. If, in addition, the duration of menstruation is considered (typically 3 to 5 days with a range of 2 to 7 days), then the experience of synchrony may last a number of months.

Strassmann argued menstrual synchrony defined as menstruation overlap should be quite common. For example, the expected difference by chance between two women with 28-day cycles—which is approximately the average length of menstrual cycles of women at the age —is 7 days. Considering that the mean duration of menses is 5 days and the range is 2 to 7 days, the probability of menstruation overlap by chance should be high.

=== Adaptivity of menstrual synchrony ===
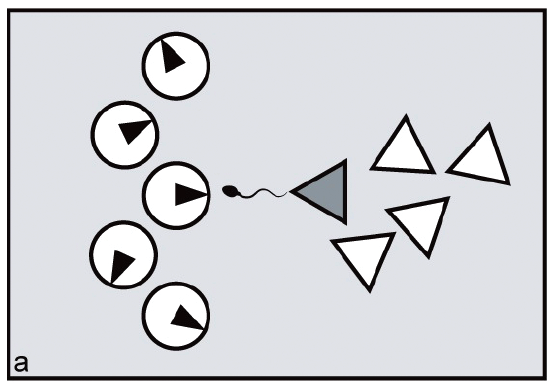
Figure a. Females competing for good genes should avoid ovulatory synchrony. Moving from one female to the next, a single dominant male under these conditions can exercise a monopoly. Key: Circle = female. Pointer = ovulation. Triangle = male.

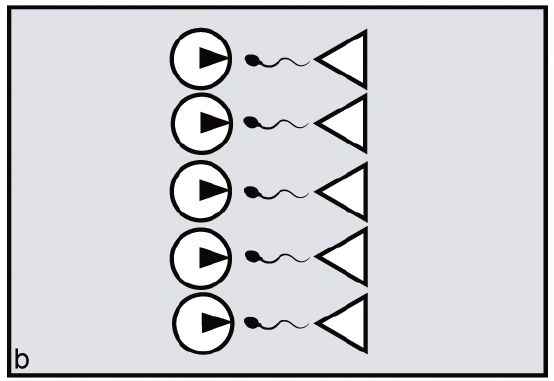
Figure b. Females in need of male time and energy should synchronize their cycles, preventing any single male from monopolising access.

In order to work out why menstrual synchrony might have evolved, it is necessary to investigate why individuals who synchronized their cycles might have had increased survival and reproduction in the evolutionary past. The relevant field in this case is behavioral ecology.

In mammalian mating systems generally, and among primates in particular, female spatio-temporal distribution – how clumped females are in the environment and how much they overlap their fertile periods – affects the ability of any single male to monopolize matings. The basic principle is that the more females are fertile at any one time, the harder it is for any single male to monopolize access to them, impregnating all simultaneously at the expense of rival males. In the case of nonhuman primates, once the number of co-cycling females rises above a critical threshold, a harem-holder may be unable to prevent other males from invading and mating with his females. A dominant male can maintain his monopoly only if his females stagger their fertile periods, so that he can impregnate them one at a time (see figure a, right). Suppose a group of female baboons need between them just one dominant male, desirable in view of his high-quality genes. Then, logically, they should avoid synchronizing their cycles. By the same token, if males during the course of human evolution became valued by females for additional purposes – hunting and bringing home food, for example – then females should resist being controlled by dominant male harem-holders. If males are useful partners to have and keep around, then ideally each female should have at least one for herself. Under those circumstances, according to this argument, the logical strategy would be for females to synchronize as tightly as they can (see figure b, right).

One implication is that there may be a link between the degree of synchrony in a population (whether seasonal, lunar or both), and the degree of reproductive egalitarianism among males. Foley and Fitzgerald objected to the idea that synchrony could have been a factor in human evolution on the grounds that for hominins with inter-birth intervals of 3–5 years, achieving synchrony was unrealistic. Infant mortality would disrupt synchrony since it would be too costly for a mother who had miscarried or lost her baby to wait until everyone else had weaned their babies and resumed cycling before having sex and getting pregnant herself. On the other hand, while conceding that it would be impossible to get clockwork synchrony throughout an inter-birth interval, Power et al. argued that once we take account of birth seasonality – enhancing the effects of menstrual synchrony by clumping fertile cycles within a relatively brief time-window – it emerges that reproductive synchrony can be effective as a female strategy to undermine primate-style sexual monopolization by dominant males. The controversy remains unresolved.

Adopting a compromise position, one school of Darwinian thought sets out from the fact that the mean length of the human menstrual cycle is 29.3 days, which is strikingly close to the 29.5 day periodicity of the moon. It is suggested that the human female may once have had adaptive reasons for evolving such a cycle length – implying some theoretical potential for synchrony to a lunar clock – but did so in an African setting under prehistoric conditions which today no longer exist. Not all archaeologists accept that lunar periodicity was ever relevant to human evolution. On the other hand, according to Curtis Marean (head of excavations at the important Middle Stone Age site of Pinnacle Point, South Africa), anatomically modern humans around 165,000 years ago – when inland regions of the continent were dry, arid and uninhabitable – became restricted to small populations clustered around coastal refugia, reliant on marine resources including shellfish whose safe harvesting at spring low tides presupposed careful tracking of lunar phase.

With gradual offshore platforms during spring low tides, substantial areas of the intertidal zone are revealed, and these are the most productive and safest shellfish collecting times… Foragers should schedule visits to coastal residential sites at times during the lunar month when spring tides are present and then move slightly inland during neaps to broaden the size of the exploitable terrestrial area.

=== Non-human species ===
Estrous synchrony, a phenomenon similar to menstrual synchrony, has been reported in several other mammalian species.

Menstrual or estrous synchrony has been reported in other species including Norway rats, hamsters, chimpanzees, and golden lion tamarins. In non-human primates, the term may also refer to the degree of overlap of menstrual or estrous cycles, which is the overlap of estrous or menses of two or more females in a group due, for example, to seasonal breeding.

However, as with early human studies on menstrual synchrony, non-human estrous synchrony studies also were criticized for methodological problems.

Subsequent studies failed to find estrous synchrony in rats, hamsters, chimpanzees, and golden lion tamarins.

==== Rats ====
McClintock also conducted a 1978 study of estrous synchrony in Norway rats (Rattus norvegicus). She reported that the estrous cycles of female rats living in groups of five were more regular than those of rats housed singly. She also reported that social interaction, and more importantly a shared air supply that allowed for olfactory communication enhanced the regularity of the rats' cycles and synchronized their estrous phases after two or three cycles. McClintock hypothesized that estrous synchrony was caused by pheromones and that a coupled oscillator mechanism produced estrous synchrony in rats This observation of menstrual synchrony in Norway rats is not the same as the Whitten effect because it was the result of the continuous interactions of ongoing cycles within a female group, rather than the result of an exposure to a single external stimulus such as male odor, which in the Whitten effect releases all exposed females simultaneously from an acyclic condition.

The coupled-oscillator hypothesis asserted that females rats release two pheromone signals. One signal is released during the follicular phase of the estrous cycle and it shortens estrous cycles. The second signal is released during the ovulatory phase of the estrous cycle and it lengthens estrous cycles. When rats live together or share the same air supply, the pheromones released by each female in a group as a function of the phase of her estrous cycle causes other females in the group to either lengthen or shorten their estrous cycles. This mutual lengthening and shortening of estrous cycles was theorized to produce synchronization of estrous cycles over time.

McClintock investigated the coupled oscillator hypothesis experimentally. She provided three groups of rats with airborne odors from female rats in three different phases of the estrous cycle: ovulatory phase, follicular phase, and luteal phase. She hypothesized that ovulatory phase odors would lengthen cycles, follicular phase odors would shorten cycles, and luteal phase odors would have no effect. Her results showed a lengthening of estrous cycles for females who received ovulatory odors, shortening of cycles for females who received follicular odors, and no effect for females who received luteal phase odors.

The coupled-ocillator hypothesis was also investigated using a computer simulation model, which was compared with data from McClintock's 1978 study. They found that a coupled oscillator mechanism could produce estrous synchrony in female rats, but the effect was very weak. The proposed mechanisms of this model were more precisely tested by controlling the airborne odors received by individual females. They found support for the hypothesis that follicular phase odors short the length of estrous cycles, but they did not find that ovulatory phase odors lengthened cycles as the earlier study by McClintock had found.

Schank conducted another experiment to test whether female rats could synchronize their cycles. He found that female rats did not synchronize their cycles and he argued that in the original McClintock study, the random control group was more asynchronous than expected by chance. When the experimental group was compared to the control group in McClintock's 1978 study, the experimental group was more synchronous than the control group but only because the control group was too asynchronous and not because the experimental group had synchronized their cycles. In a follow-up study, Schank again found no effect of estrous synchrony in rats.

==== Hamsters ====
In 1980, estrous synchrony was reported in female hamsters. In their study, hamsters were housed in four colony phase of the estrous cycle. They monitored and females in each room and removed the females that did not stay in phase. They placed a wire metal cage (i.e., condo consisting of four equally sized rectangular compartments) in the corner of each room. For each room, three animals were randomly selected and placed in three of the condo compartments. A fourth female was randomly selected from another room and placed in the remaining condo compartment. In the control condition, all four females placed in the condos came from the same room. Females were kept in the condos until all four animals exhibited 4 consecutive days of synchrony. They were then removed and a new group was formed until all combinations were tested. They found that the fourth female in the experimental condition always synchronized with the remaining three

Their study was criticized as methodologically flawed because females were left together until the fourth female synchronized with the others. When female hamsters are subjected to the stress of stranger hamsters, their cycles become irregular. If only the female from another room's cycles change, then by chance, the longer the female is left with the other three, the more likely it is that she will synchronize by chance with the other three. In a follow-up experimental study motivated by this methodological critique, no evidence for estrous synchrony was found for female hamsters.

==== Chimpanzees ====
In 1985, estrous synchrony was reported in female chimpanzees. In her study, 10 female chimpanzees were caged, at different times, in two groups of four and six in the same building. The anogenital swelling of each female was recorded daily. Synchrony was measured by calculating the absolute differences in days between (1) the day of swelling onset and (2) the day of maximum swelling. She reported a statistically significant average difference of 5.7 days for onset of swelling and 8.0 days for maximum swelling. Schank, however, noted that due to females who became pregnant and who stopped cycling, most of the data were based on only four animals. He performed a computer simulation study to calculate the expected swelling onset and maximal swelling onset difference for female chimpanzees with the reported mean estrous cycle lengths of 36.7 (with a standard deviation of 4.3) days. He reported an expected difference of 7.7 days. Thus, a maximum swelling difference of 8.0 days is about what would be expected by chance and given that only four animals contributed data to the study, a 5.7 day onset difference is not significantly less than 7.7 days.

Since then Matsumoto and colleagues have reported estrous asynchrony in groups of free-living chimpanzees in Mahale Mountains National Park, Tanzania. They subsequently investigated whether estrous asynchrony was adaptive for female chimpanzees. They tested three hypotheses about the adaptiveness of estrous asynchrony: (1) females become asynchronous to increase copulation frequency and opportunities for giving birth; (2) paternity confusion to reduce infanticide; and (3) sperm competition. They found no support for hypothesis (1) and partial support for hypotheses (2) and (3).

==== Golden lion tamarins ====
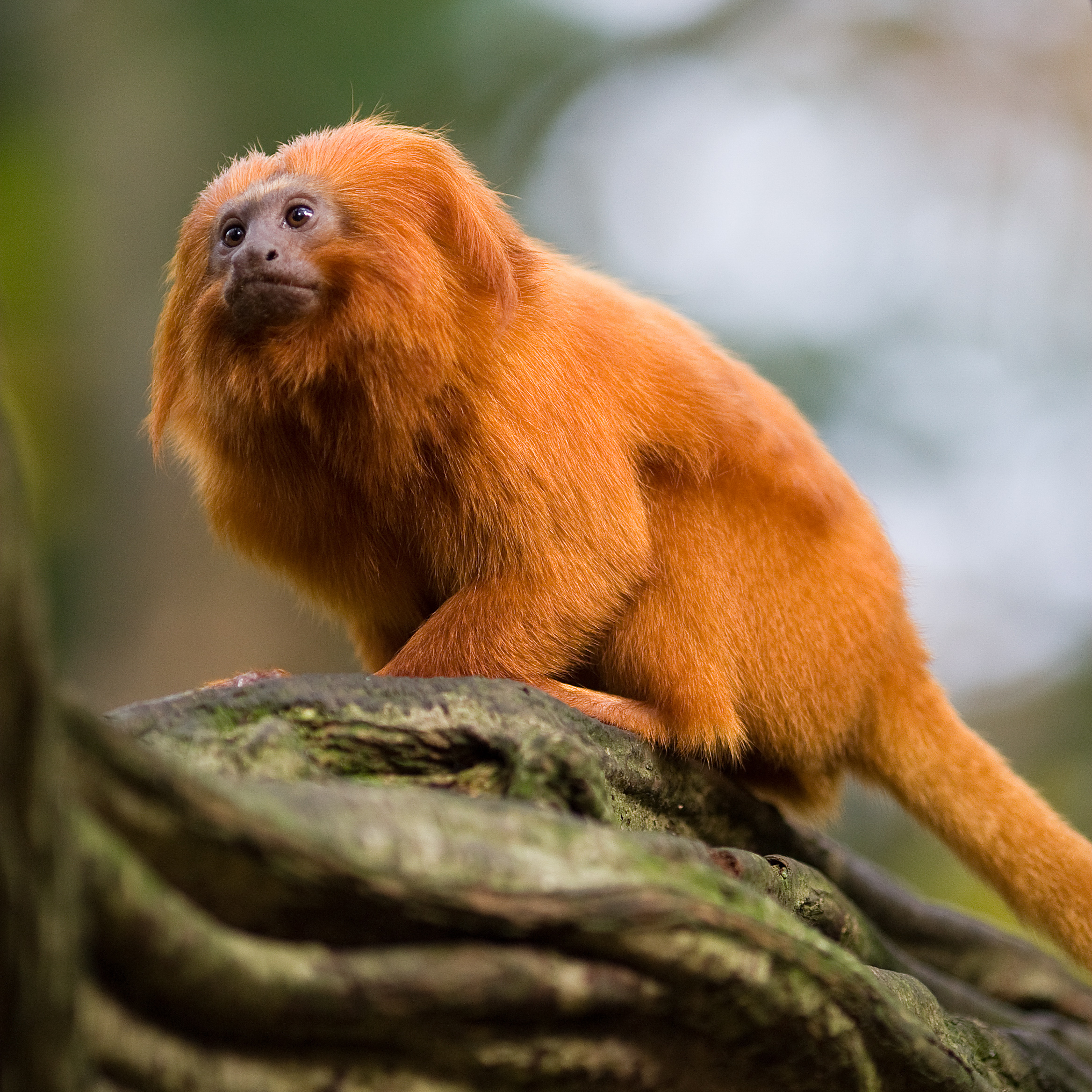
A golden lion tamarin

In 1987, estrous synchrony was reported in female golden lion tamarins by French and Stribley. Their subjects consisted of five adult female golden lion tamarins that were housed in two groups. Two females were housed with adult males and three females (a mother and two daughters) were housed with an adult male and infant male. They reported a 2.11 day difference in peak cycle estrogen for the two groups, which was less than the 4.5 day difference that they calculated would be the difference based on golden lion tamarins having a 19-day estrous cycle. Schank reanalyzed their study with the help of computer simulation and reported that a 2.11 day difference was not likely statistically significant. Monfort and colleagues conducted a study with eight females housed in pairs and found no evidence of synchrony.

==== Mandrills ====
Setchella, Kendala, and Tyniec investigated whether menstrual synchrony occurred in a semi-free-ranging population of mandrills of 10-group years. They reported that mandrills do not synchronize their menstrual cycles and concluded that cycle synchrony does not occur in non-human primates.

==== Lions ====
Oestrus synchrony has been reported of lions in the wild.

== See also ==
- Culture and menstruation
