= Lee–Boot effect =

Phenomenon in oestrous cycles

The Lee–Boot effect is a phenomenon concerning the suppression or prolongation of oestrous cycles of mature female mice (and other rodents), when females are housed in groups and isolated from males. It is caused by the effects of an estrogen-dependent pheromone, possibly 2,5-dimethylpyrazine, which is released via the urine and acts on the vomeronasal organ of recipients. This pheromone lowers the concentration of luteinizing hormone and elevates prolactin levels, synchronising or stopping the recipient's cycle. This effect goes some way to explain why spontaneous pseudopregnancy can occur in mice. The same response is invoked from isolated females when brought into contact with urine-soaked bedding from other females' cages. The adrenal glands are required for production of the urine pheromone which is responsible for this effect.

== See also ==
- Menstrual synchrony
- Whitten effect
