= Sailing ship =

Large wind-powered water vessel

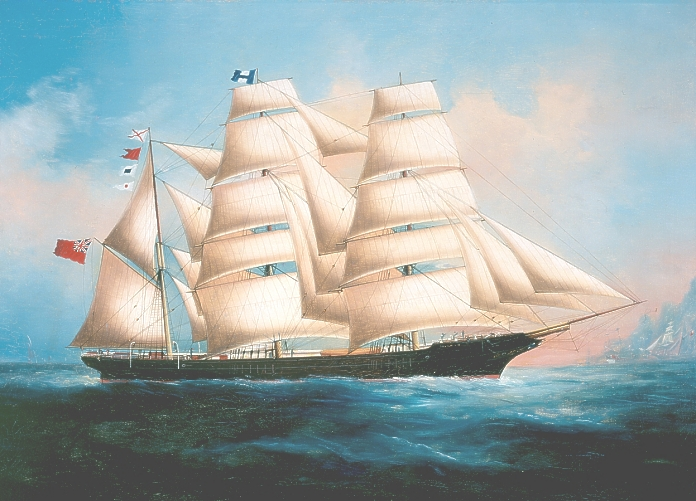
A barque—a three-masted sailing ship with square sails on the first two masts (fore and main) and fore-and-aft sails on the mizzenmast

Sail plans

Full-rigged ship

Barque

Barquentine

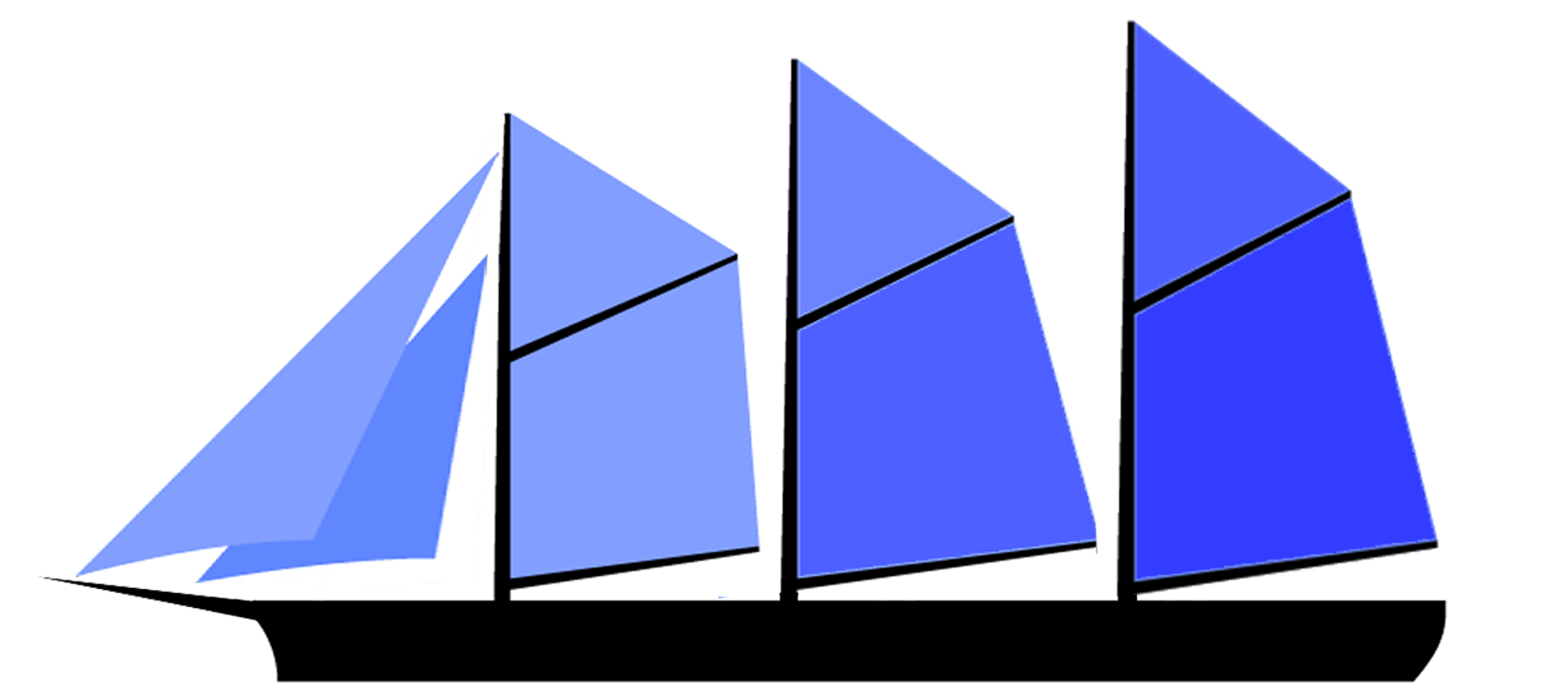
Schooner

Showing three-masted examples, progressing from square sails on each to all fore-and-aft sails on each.

A sailing ship is a sea-going vessel that uses sails mounted on masts to harness the power of wind and propel the vessel. There is a variety of sail plans that propel sailing ships, employing square-rigged or fore-and-aft sails. Some ships carry square sails on each mast—the brig and full-rigged ship, said to be "ship-rigged" when there are three or more masts. Others carry only fore-and-aft sails on each mast, for instance some schooners. Still others employ a combination of square and fore-and-aft sails, including the barque, barquentine, and brigantine.

Early sailing ships were used for river and coastal waters in ancient Egypt and the Mediterranean. The Austronesian peoples developed maritime technologies that included the fore-and-aft crab-claw sail and with catamaran and outrigger hull configurations, which enabled the Austronesian expansion into the islands of the Indo-Pacific. This expansion originated in Taiwan c. 3000 BC and propagated through Island Southeast Asia, reaching Near Oceania c. 1500 BC, Hawaii c. 900 AD, and New Zealand c. 1200 AD. The maritime trading network in the Indo-Pacific dates from at least 1500 BC. Later developments in Asia produced the junk and dhow—vessels that incorporated features unknown in Europe at the time.

European sailing ships with predominantly square rigs became prevalent during the Age of Discovery (15th to 17th centuries), when they crossed oceans between continents and around the world. In the European Age of Sail, a full-rigged ship was one with a bowsprit and three masts, each of which consists of a lower, top, and topgallant mast. Most sailing ships were merchantmen, but the Age of Sail also saw the development of large fleets of well-armed warships. The many steps of technological development of steamships during the 19th century provided slowly increasing competition for sailing ships—initially only on short routes where high prices could be charged. By the 1880s, ships with triple-expansion steam engines had the fuel efficiency to compete with sail on all major routes—and with scheduled sailings that were not affected by the wind direction. However, commercial sailing vessels could still be found working into the 20th century, although in reducing numbers and only in certain trades.

== History ==
By the Age of Discovery—starting in the 15th century—square-rigged, multi-masted vessels were the norm and were guided by navigation techniques that included the magnetic compass and making sightings of the sun and stars that allowed transoceanic voyages. The Age of Sail reached its peak in the 18th and 19th centuries with large, heavily armed battleships and merchant sailing ships.

Sailing and steam ships coexisted for much of the 19th century. The steamers of the early part of the century had very poor fuel efficiency and were suitable only for a small number of roles, such as towing sailing ships and providing short route passenger and mail services. Both sailing and steam ships saw large technological improvements over the century. Ultimately the two large stepwise improvements in fuel efficiency of compound and then triple-expansion steam engines made the steamship, by the 1880s, able to compete in the vast majority of trades. Commercial sail still continued into the 20th century, with the last ceasing to trade by c. 1960.

=== South China Sea and Austronesia ===
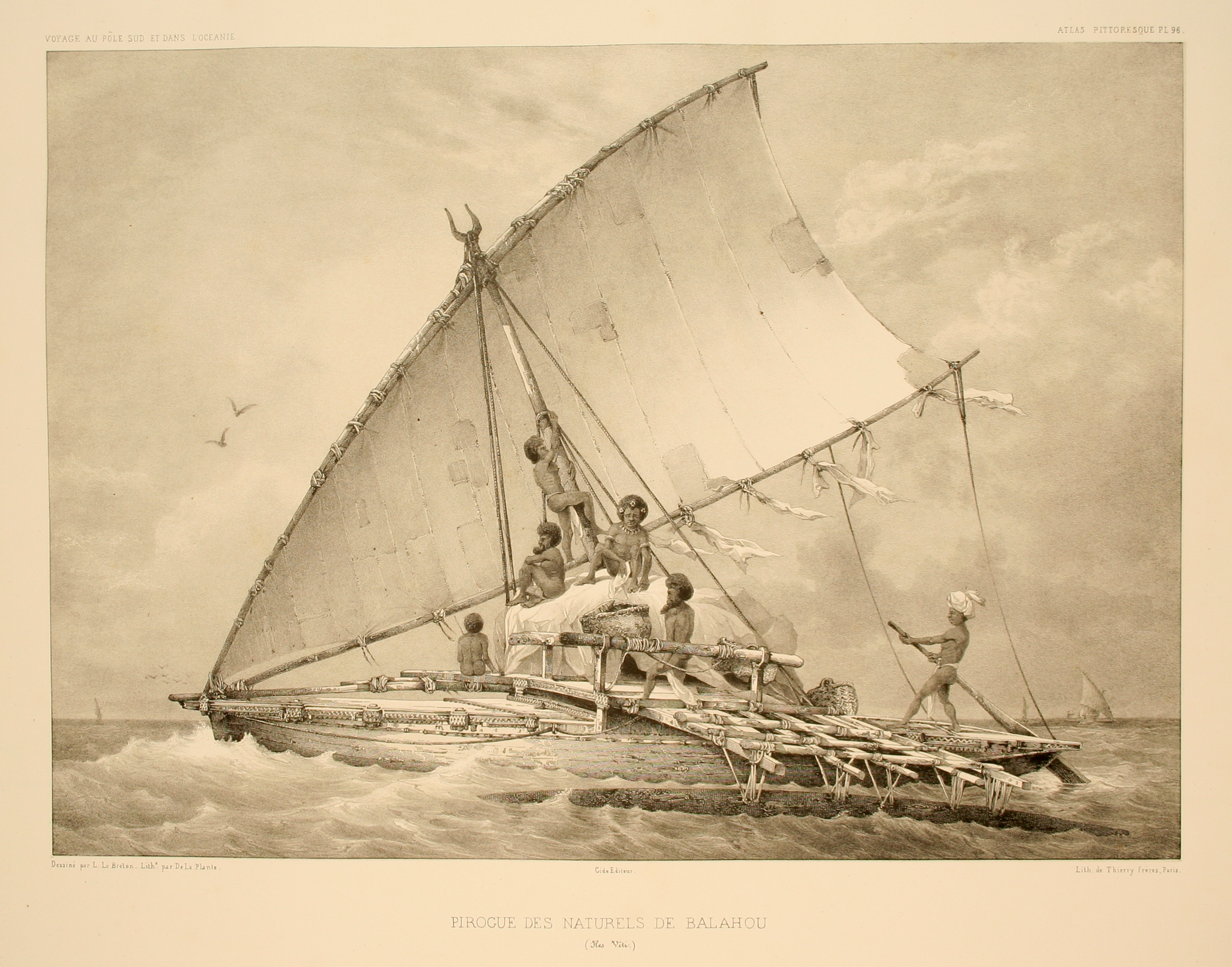
Fijian voyaging outrigger boat with a crab claw sail, an example of a typical Austronesian vessel with outriggers and a fore-and-aft sail

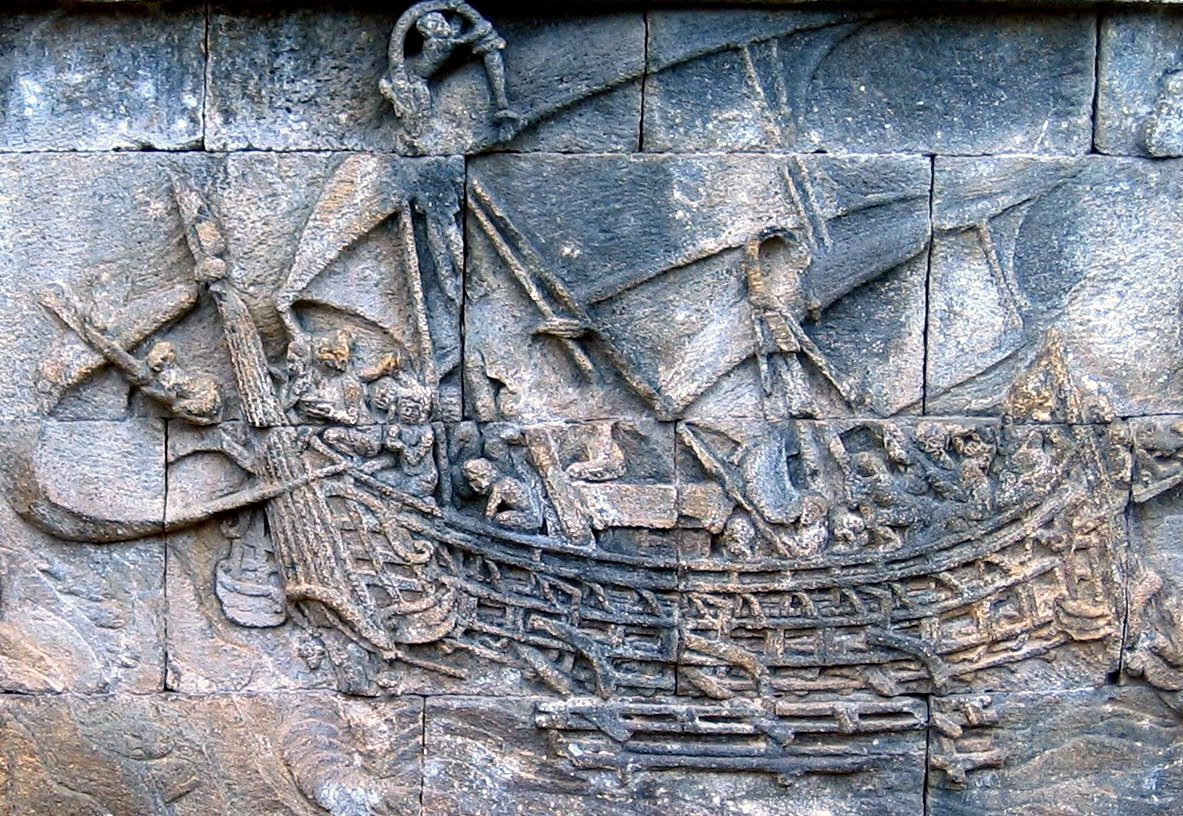
A carved stone relief panel showing a Borobudur ship (Austronesian) from 8th century Java, depicted with outriggers and fore-and-aft tanja sails

Chinese junk Keying with a center-mounted rudder post, c. 1848

Early sea-going sailing vessels were used by the Austronesian peoples. The invention of catamarans, outriggers, and crab claw sails enabled the Austronesian Expansion at around 3000 to 1500 BC. From Taiwan, they rapidly colonized the islands of Maritime Southeast Asia, then sailed further onwards to Micronesia, Island Melanesia, Polynesia, and Madagascar. Austronesian rigs were distinctive in that they had spars supporting both the upper and lower edges of the sails (and sometimes in between), in contrast to western rigs which only had a spar on the upper edge.

Large Austronesian trading ships with as many as four sails were recorded by Han dynasty (206 BC – 220 AD) scholars as the kunlun bo or K'un-lun po (崑崙舶, lit. "ship of the Kunlun people"). They were booked by Chinese Buddhist pilgrims for passage to Southern India and Sri Lanka. Bas reliefs of large Javanese outriggers ships with various configurations of tanja sails are also found in the Borobudur temple, dating back to the 8th century CE.

By the 10th century AD, the Song dynasty started building the first Chinese seafaring junks, which adopted several features of the K'un-lun po. The junk rig in particular, became associated with Chinese coast-hugging trading ships. Junks in China were constructed from teak with pegs and nails; they featured watertight compartments and acquired center-mounted tillers and rudders. These ships became the basis for the development of Chinese warships during the Mongol Yuan dynasty, and were used in the unsuccessful Mongol invasions of Japan and Java.

The Ming dynasty (1368–1644) saw the use of junks as long-distance trading vessels. Chinese Admiral Zheng He reportedly sailed to India, Arabia, and southern Africa on a trade and diplomatic mission. Literary lore suggests that his largest vessel, the "Treasure Ship", measured 400 feet (120 m) in length and 150 feet (46 m) in width, whereas modern research suggests that it was unlikely to have exceeded 70 metres (230 ft) in length.

=== Mediterranean and Baltic ===
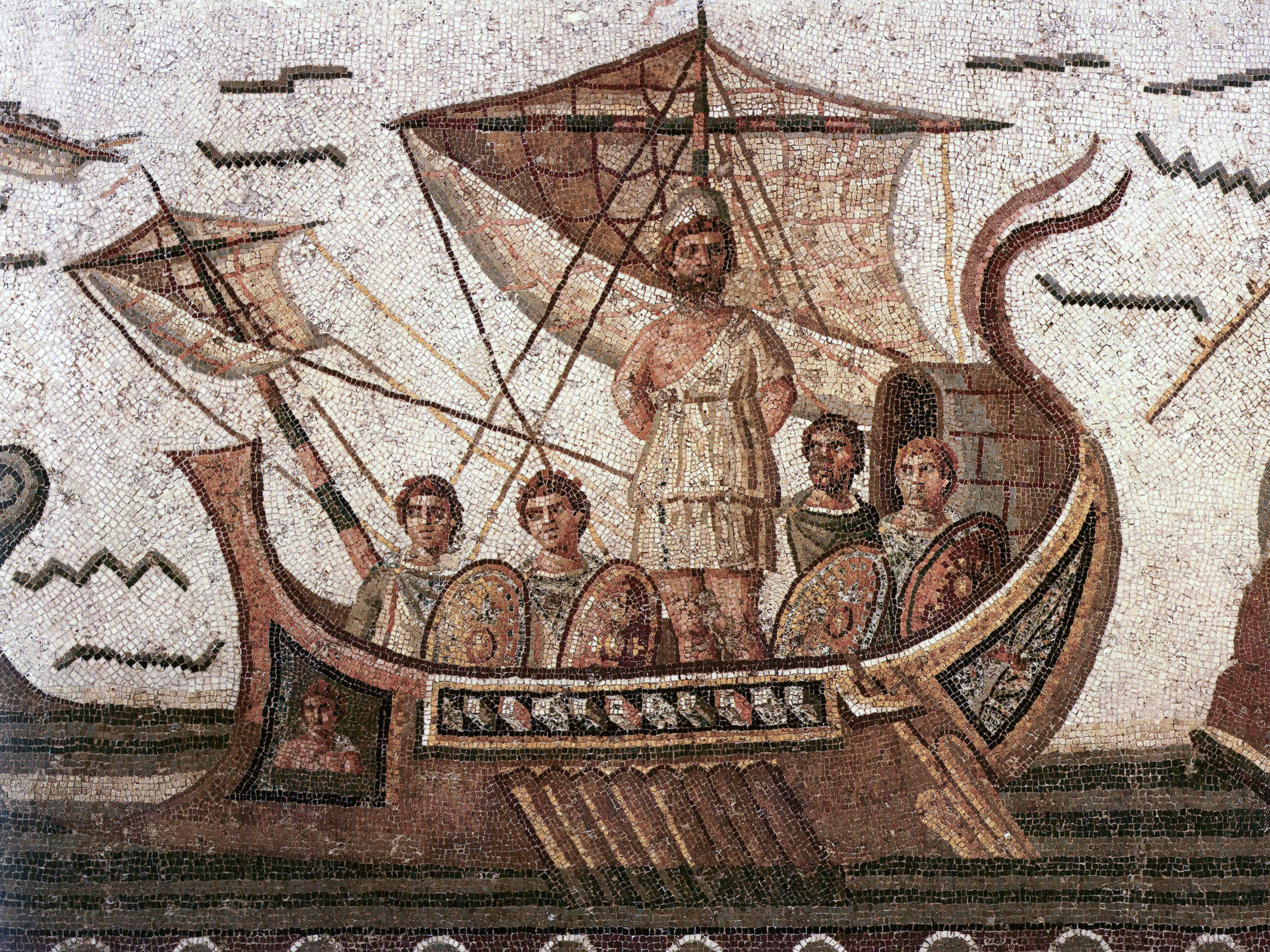
Roman ship with sails, oars, and a steering oar

Sailing ships in the Mediterranean region date back to at least 3000 BC, when Egyptians used a bipod mast to support a single square sail on a vessel that mainly relied on multiple paddlers. Later the mast became a single pole, and paddles were supplanted with oars. Such vessels plied both the Nile and the Mediterranean coast. The Minoan civilization of Crete may have been the world's first thalassocracy brought to prominence by sailing vessels dating to before 1800 BC (Middle Minoan IIB). Between 1000 BC and 400 AD, the Phoenicians, Greeks and Romans developed ships that were powered by square sails, sometimes with oars to supplement their capabilities. Such vessels used a steering oar as a rudder to control direction.

Starting in the 8th century in Denmark, Vikings were building clinker-constructed longships propelled by a single, square sail, when practical, and oars, when necessary. A related craft was the knarr, which plied the Baltic and North Seas, using primarily sail power. The windward edge of the sail was stiffened with a beitass, a pole that fitted into the lower corner of the sail, when sailing close to the wind.

=== Indian Ocean ===
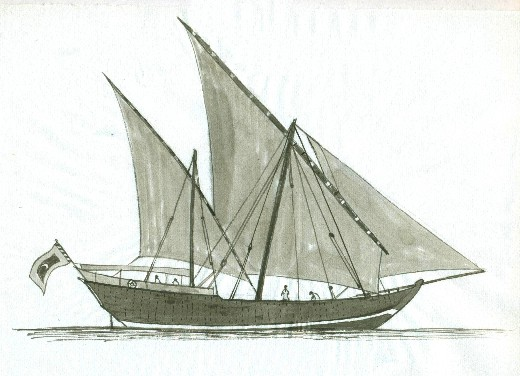
A traditional Maldivian Baghlah with a fore-and-aft lateen rig

India's maritime history began during the 3rd millennium BCE when inhabitants of the Indus Valley initiated maritime trading contact with Mesopotamia. Indian kingdoms such as the Kalinga from as early as 2nd century CE are believed to have had sailing ships. One of the earliest instances of documented evidence of Indian sailing ship building comes from the mural of three-masted ship in the Ajanta caves that date back to 400-500 CE.

The Indian Ocean was the venue for increasing trade between India and Africa between 1200 and 1500. The vessels employed would be classified as dhows with lateen rigs. During this interval such vessels grew in capacity from 100 to 400 tonnes. Dhows were often built with teak planks from India and Southeast Asia, sewn together with coconut husk fiber—no nails were employed. This period also saw the implementation of center-mounted rudders, controlled with a tiller.

=== Global exploration ===
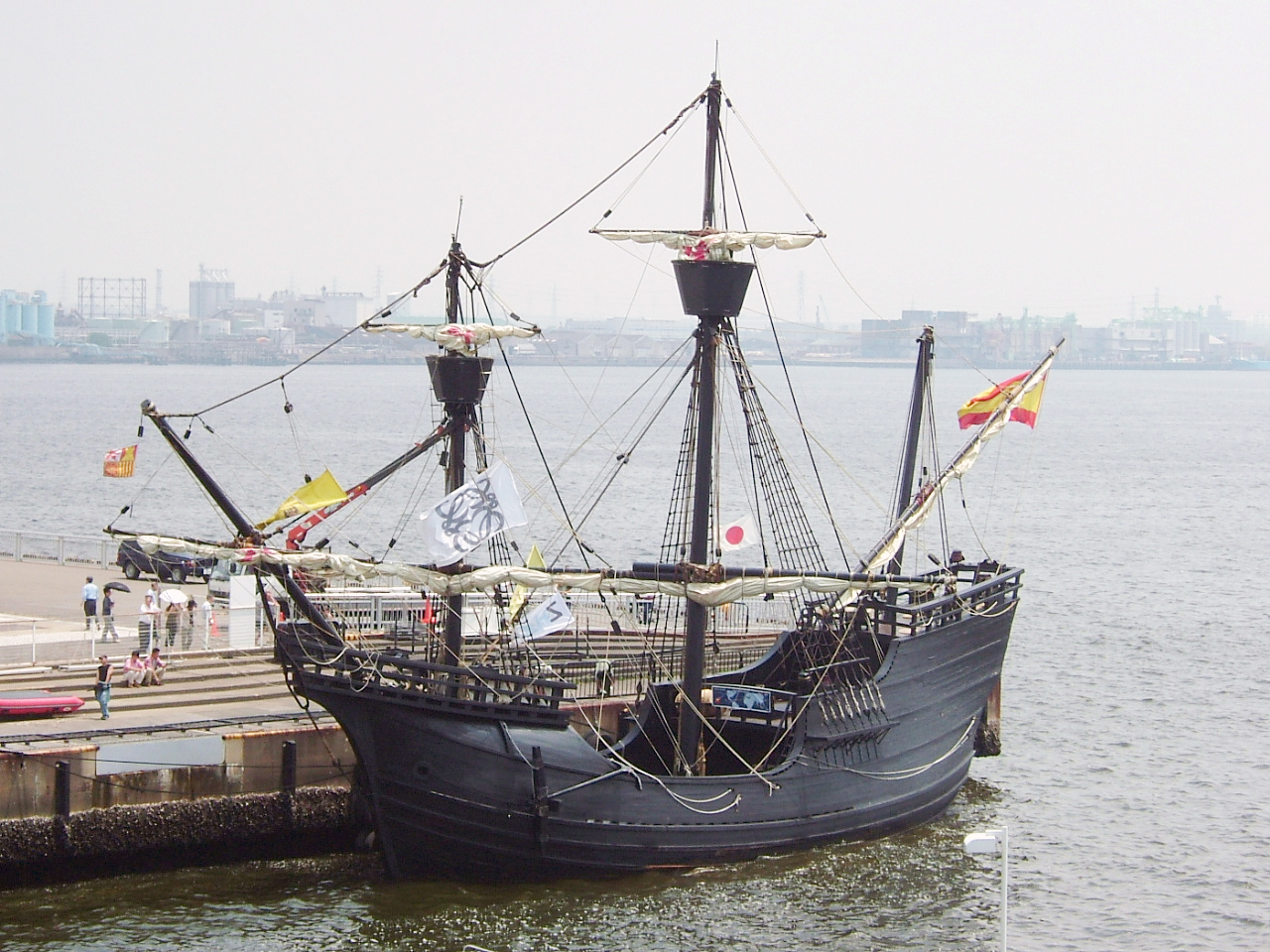
Replica of Ferdinand Magellan's carrack, Victoria, which completed the first global circumnavigation.

Technological advancements that were important to the Age of Discovery in the 15th century were the adoption of the magnetic compass and advances in ship design.

The compass was an addition to the ancient method of navigation based on sightings of the sun and stars. The compass was invented by Chinese. It had been used for navigation in China by the 11th century and was adopted by the Arab traders in the Indian Ocean. The compass spread to Europe by the late 12th or early 13th century. Use of the compass for navigation in the Indian Ocean was first mentioned in 1232. The Europeans used a "dry" compass, with a needle on a pivot. The compass card was also a European invention.

At the beginning of the 15th century, the carrack was the most capable European ocean-going ship. It was carvel-built and large enough to be stable in heavy seas. It was capable of carrying a large cargo and the provisions needed for very long voyages. Later carracks were square-rigged on the foremast and mainmast and lateen-rigged on the mizzenmast. They had a high rounded stern with large aftcastle, forecastle and bowsprit at the stem. As the predecessor of the galleon, the carrack was one of the most influential ship designs in history; while ships became more specialized in the following centuries, the basic design remained unchanged throughout this period.

Ships of this era were only able to sail approximately 70° into the wind and tacked from one side to the other across the wind with difficulty, which made it challenging to avoid shipwrecks when near shores or shoals during storms. Nonetheless, such vessels reached India around Africa with Vasco da Gama, the Americas with Christopher Columbus, and around the world under Ferdinand Magellan.

=== 1700 to 1850 ===
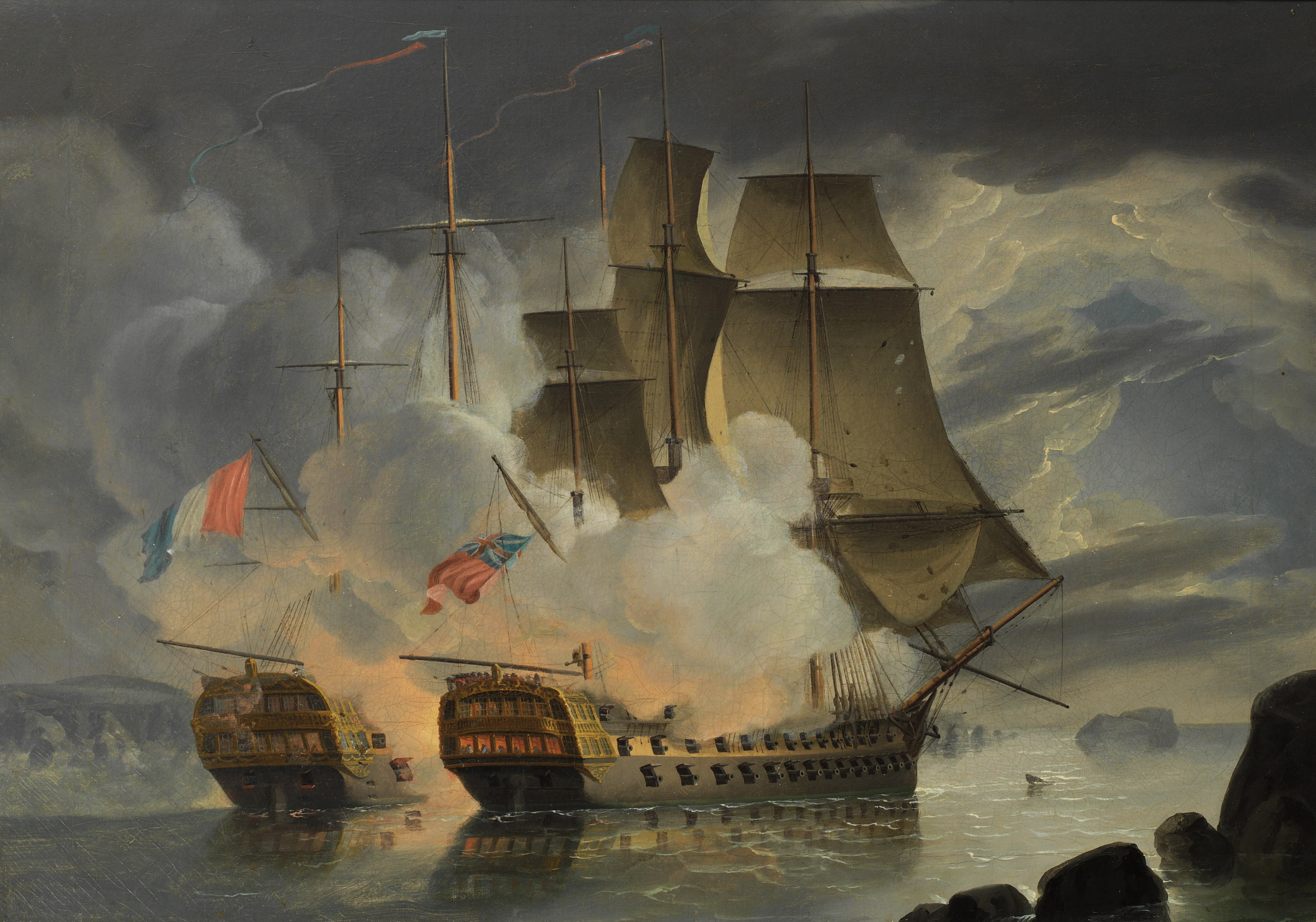
1798 sea battle between a French and British man-of-war

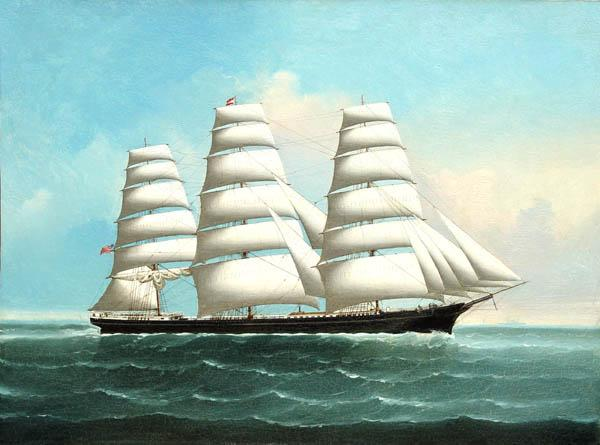
A late-19th-century American clipper ship

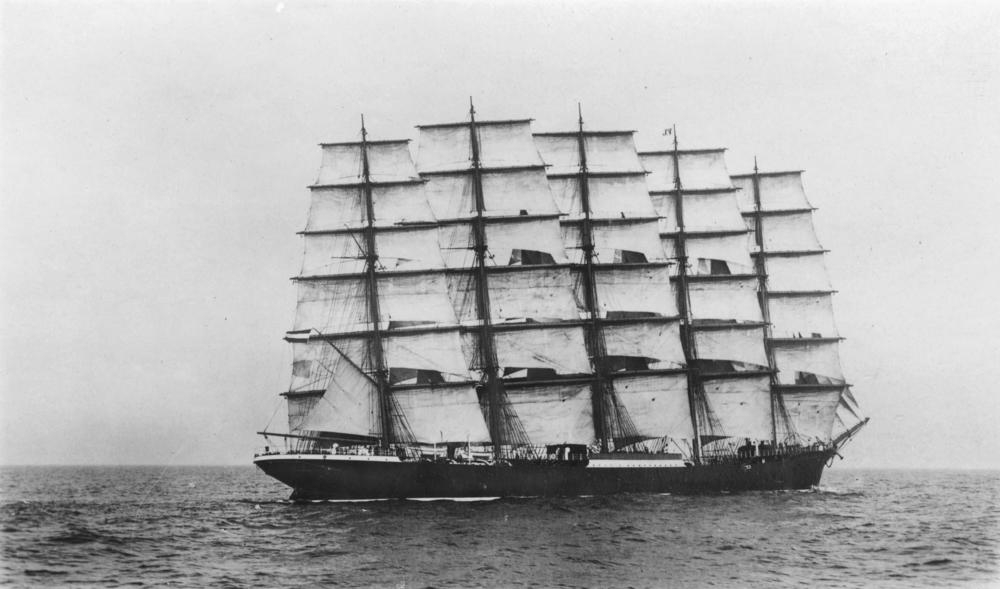
The five-masted Preussen was the largest sailing ship ever built.

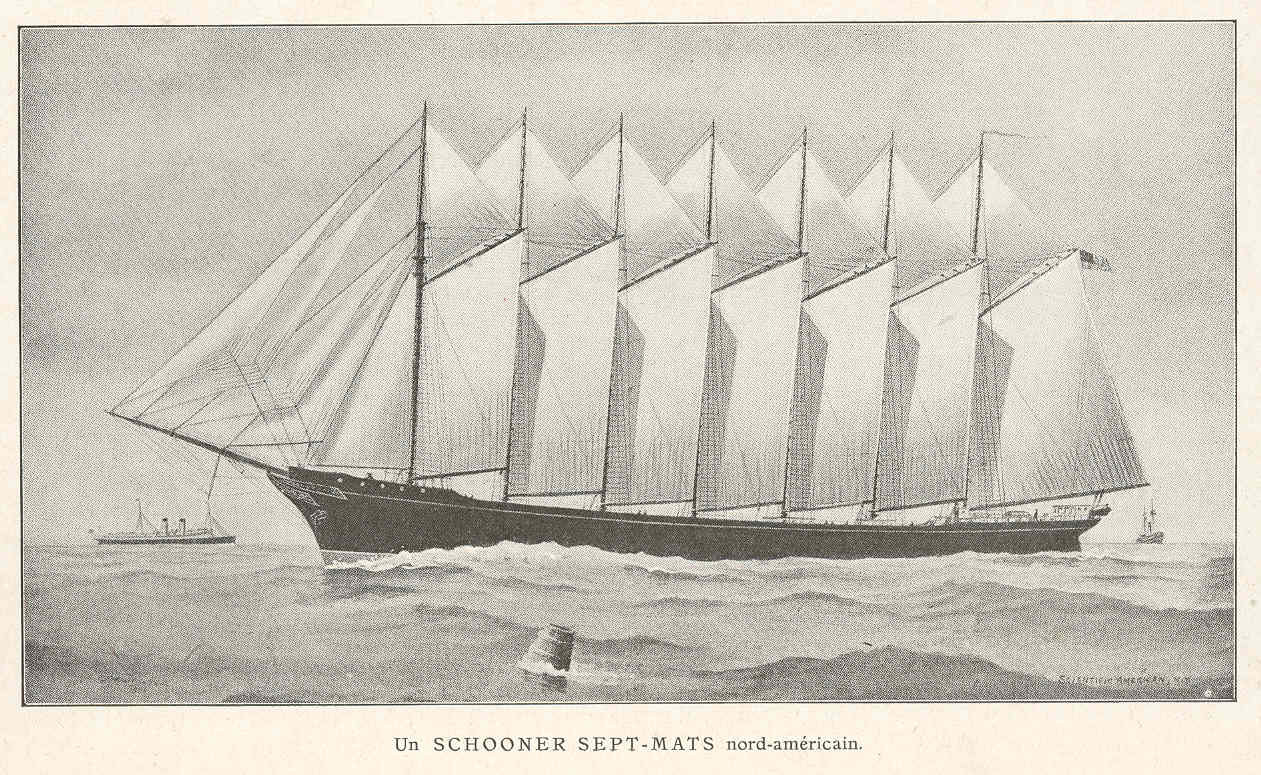
Schooners became favored for some coast-wise commerce after 1850—they enabled a small crew to handle sails.

Sailing ships became longer and faster over time, with ship-rigged vessels carrying taller masts with more square sails. Other sail plans emerged, as well, that had just fore-and-aft sails (schooners), or a mixture of the two (brigantines, barques and barquentines).

==== Warships ====
Cannons were introduced in the 14th century, but did not become common at sea until they could be reloaded quickly enough to be reused in the same battle. The size of a ship required to carry a large number of cannon made oar-based propulsion impossible, and warships came to rely primarily on sails. The sailing man-of-war emerged during the 16th century.

By the middle of the 17th century, warships were carrying increasing numbers of cannon on three decks. Naval tactics evolved to bring each ship's firepower to bear in a line of battle—coordinated movements of a fleet of warships to engage a line of ships in the enemy fleet. Carracks with a single cannon deck evolved into galleons with as many as two full cannon decks, which evolved into the man-of-war, and further into the ship of the line—designed for engaging the enemy in a line of battle. One side of a ship was expected to shoot broadsides against an enemy ship at close range. In the 18th century, the small and fast frigate and sloop-of-war—too small to stand in the line of battle—evolved to convoy trade, scout for enemy ships and blockade enemy coasts.

==== Clippers ====
The term "clipper" started to be used in the first quarter of the 19th century. It was applied to sailing vessels designed primarily for speed. Only a small proportion of sailing vessels could properly have the term applied to them.

Early examples were the schooners and brigantines, called Baltimore clippers, used for blockade running or as privateers in the War of 1812 and afterwards for smuggling opium or illegally transporting slaves. Larger clippers, usually ship or barque rigged and with a different hull design, were built for the California trade (from east coast USA ports to San Francisco) after gold was discovered in 1848 – the associated shipbuilding boom lasted until 1854.

Clippers were built for trade between the United Kingdom and China after the East India Company lost its monopoly in 1834. The primary cargo was tea, and sailing ships, particularly tea clippers, dominated this long-distance route until the development of fuel efficient steamships coincided with the opening of the Suez Canal in 1869.

Other clippers worked on the Australian immigrant routes or, in smaller quantities, in any role where a fast passage secured higher rates of freight (Note: Freight: the price paid for carrying a cargo) or passenger fares. Whilst many clippers were ship-rigged, the definition is not limited to any rig.

Clippers were generally built for a specific trade: those in the California trade had to withstand the seas of Cape Horn, whilst tea clippers were designed for the lighter and contrary winds of the China Sea. All had fine lines, (Note: The fineness of a ship's hull is best described by considering a rectangular cuboid with the same length, breadth (beam) and depth as the hull of the ship. The more material that you have to carve away to get the shape of the ship's hull, the finer the lines.) with a well streamlined hull and carried a large sail area. To get the best of this, a skilled and determined master was needed in command.

==== Copper sheathing ====
During the Age of Sail, ships' hulls were under frequent attack by shipworm (which affected the structural strength of timbers), and barnacles and various marine weeds (which affected ship speed). Since before the common era, a variety of coatings had been applied to hulls to counter this effect, including pitch, wax, tar, oil, sulfur and arsenic. In the mid 18th century copper sheathing was developed as a defense against such bottom fouling. After coping with problems of galvanic deterioration of metal hull fasteners, sacrificial anodes were developed, which were designed to corrode, instead of the hull fasteners. The practice became widespread on naval vessels, starting in the late 18th century, and on merchant vessels, starting in the early 19th century, until the advent of iron and steel hulls.

=== 1850 to 1900 ===
Iron-hulled sailing ships, often referred to as "windjammers" or "tall ships", represented the final evolution of sailing ships at the end of the Age of Sail. They were built to carry bulk cargo for long distances in the nineteenth and early twentieth centuries. They were the largest of merchant sailing ships, with three to five masts and square sails, as well as other sail plans. They carried lumber, guano, grain or ore between continents. Later examples had steel hulls. Iron-hulled sailing ships were mainly built from the 1870s to 1900, when steamships began to outpace them economically, due to their ability to keep a schedule regardless of the wind. Steel hulls also replaced iron hulls at around the same time. Even into the twentieth century, sailing ships could hold their own on transoceanic voyages such as Australia to Europe, since they did not require bunkerage for coal nor fresh water for steam, and they were faster than the early steamers, which usually could barely make 8 knots (15 km/h).

The four-masted, iron-hulled ship, introduced in 1875 with the full-rigged County of Peebles, represented an especially efficient configuration that prolonged the competitiveness of sail against steam in the later part of the 19th century. The largest example of such ships was the five-masted, full-rigged ship Preussen, which had a load capacity of 7,800 tonnes. Ships transitioned from all sail to all steam-power from the mid 19th century into the 20th. Five-masted Preussen used steam power for driving the winches, hoists and pumps, and could be manned by a crew of 48, compared with four-masted Kruzenshtern, which has a crew of 257.

Coastal top-sail schooners with a crew as small as two managing the sail handling became an efficient way to carry bulk cargo, since only the fore-sails required tending while tacking and steam-driven machinery was often available for raising the sails and the anchor.

=== 1950 to 2000 ===
In the 20th century, the DynaRig allowed central, automated control of all sails in a manner that obviates the need for sending crew aloft. This was developed in the 1960s in Germany as a low-carbon footprint propulsion alternative for commercial ships. The rig automatically sets and reefs sails; its mast rotates to align the sails with the wind. The sailing yachts Maltese Falcon and Black Pearl employ the rig.

=== 21st century and contemporary experimental sail ===
In the 21st century, due to concern about climate change and the possibility of cost savings, companies explored using wind-power to reduce heavy fuel needs on large containerized cargo ships. By 2023, around 30 ships were using sails or attached kites, with the number expected to grow. The following year, The Economist wrote that the technology was at an inflection point as it moved from trials and testing towards adoption by the industry.

== Features ==
Every sailing ship has a sail plan that is adapted to the purpose of the vessel and the ability of the crew; each has a hull, rigging and masts to hold up the sails that use the wind to power the ship; the masts are supported by standing rigging and the sails are adjusted by running rigging.

=== Hull ===
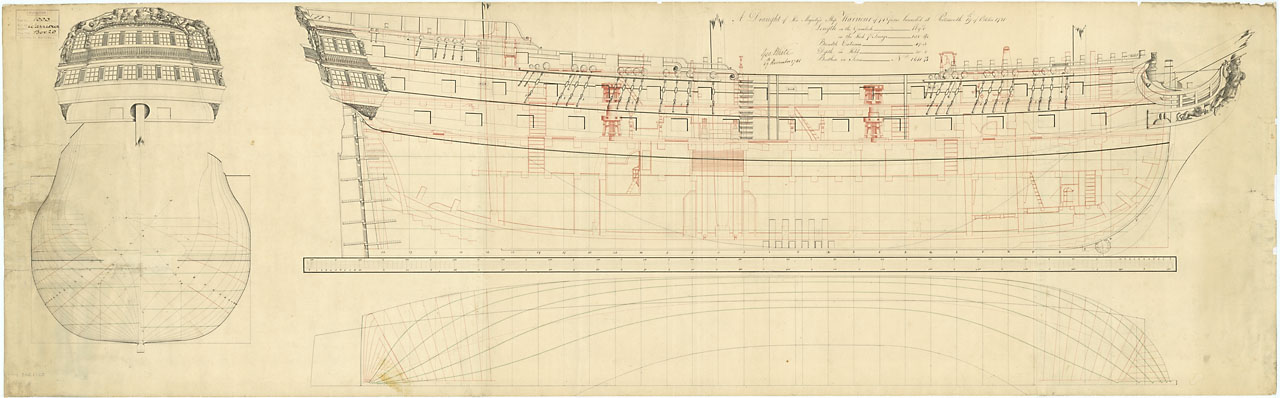
Hull form lines, lengthwise and in cross-section from a 1781 plan

Hull shapes for sailing ships evolved from being relatively short and blunt to being longer and finer at the bow. By the nineteenth century, ships were built with reference to a half model, made from wooden layers that were pinned together. Each layer could be scaled to the actual size of the vessel in order to lay out its hull structure, starting with the keel and leading to the ship's ribs. The ribs were pieced together from curved elements, called futtocks and tied in place until the installation of the planking. Typically, planking was caulked with a tar-impregnated yarn made from manila or hemp to make the planking watertight. Starting in the mid-19th century, iron was used first for the hull structure and later for its watertight sheathing.

=== Masts ===
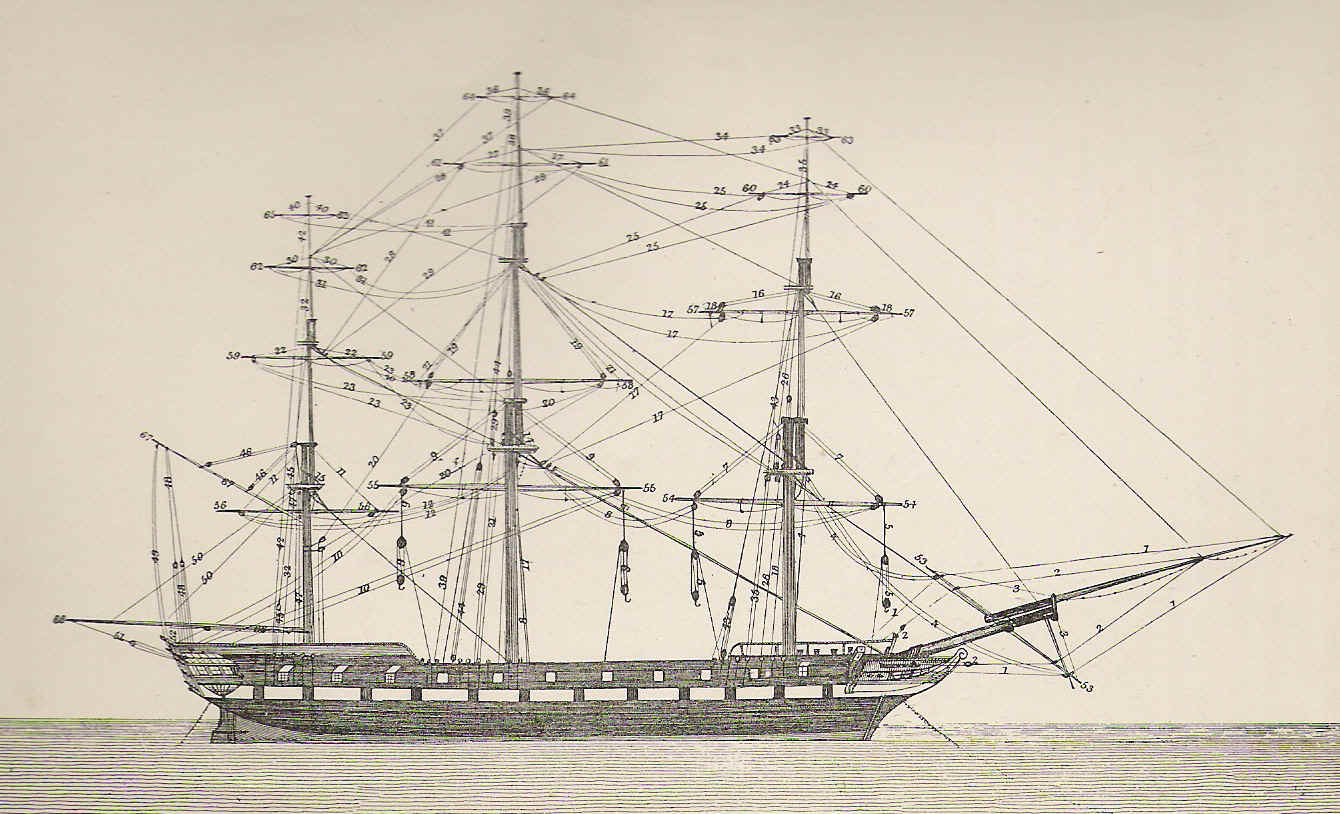
Diagram of rigging on a square-rigged ship.

Until the mid-19th century all vessels' masts were made of wood formed from a single or several pieces of timber which typically consisted of the trunk of a conifer tree. From the 16th century, vessels were often built of a size requiring masts taller and thicker than could be made from single tree trunks. On these larger vessels, to achieve the required height, the masts were built from up to four sections (also called masts), known in order of rising height above the decks as the lower, top, topgallant and royal masts. Giving the lower sections sufficient thickness necessitated building them up from separate pieces of wood. Such a section was known as a made mast, as opposed to sections formed from single pieces of timber, which were known as pole masts. Starting in the second half of the 19th century, masts were made of iron or steel.

For ships with square sails the principal masts, given their standard names in bow to stern (front to back) order, are:

- Fore-mast – the mast nearest the bow, or the mast forward of the main-mast with sections: fore-mast lower, fore topmast, and fore topgallant mast
- Main-mast – the tallest mast, usually located near the center of the ship with sections: main-mast lower, main topmast, main topgallant mast, royal mast (sometimes)
- Mizzen-mast – the aft-most mast. Typically shorter than the fore-mast with sections: mizzen-mast lower, mizzen topmast, and mizzen topgallant mast.

=== Sails ===
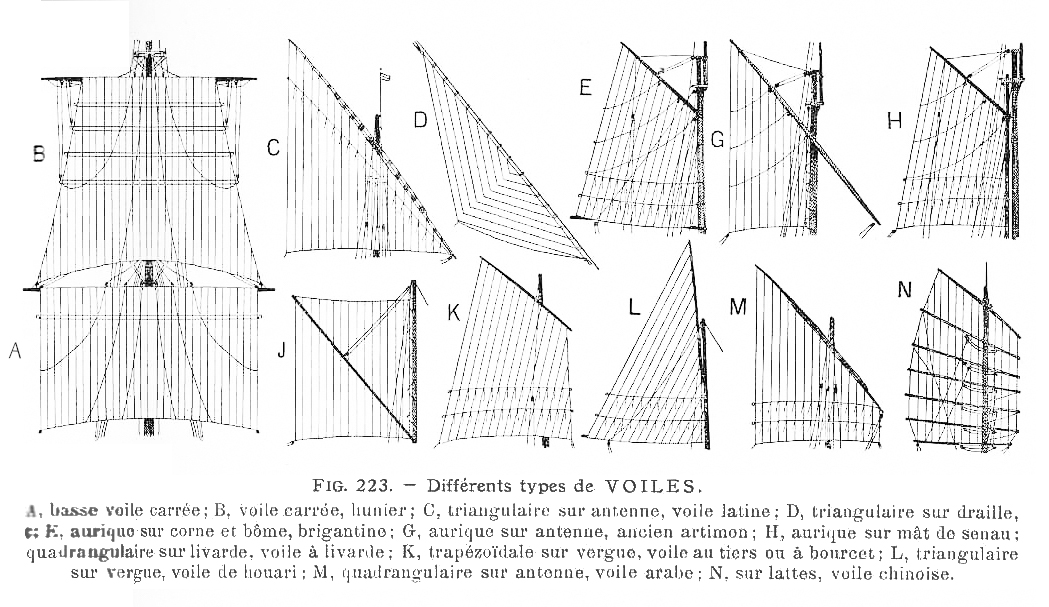
Different sail types.

Each rig is configured in a sail plan, appropriate to the size of the sailing craft. Both square-rigged and fore-and-aft rigged vessels have been built with a wide range of configurations for single and multiple masts.

Types of sail that can be part of a sail plan can be broadly classed by how they are attached to the sailing craft:

- To a stay – Sails attached to stays, include jibs, which are attached to forestays and staysails, which are mounted on other stays (typically wire cable) that support other masts from the bow aft.
- To a mast – Fore-and-aft sails directly attached to the mast at the luff include gaff-rigged quadrilateral and Bermuda triangular sails.
- To a spar – Sails attached to a spar include both square sails and such fore-and-aft quadrilateral sails as lug rigs, junk and spritsails and such triangular sails as the lateen, and the crab claw.

=== Rigging ===
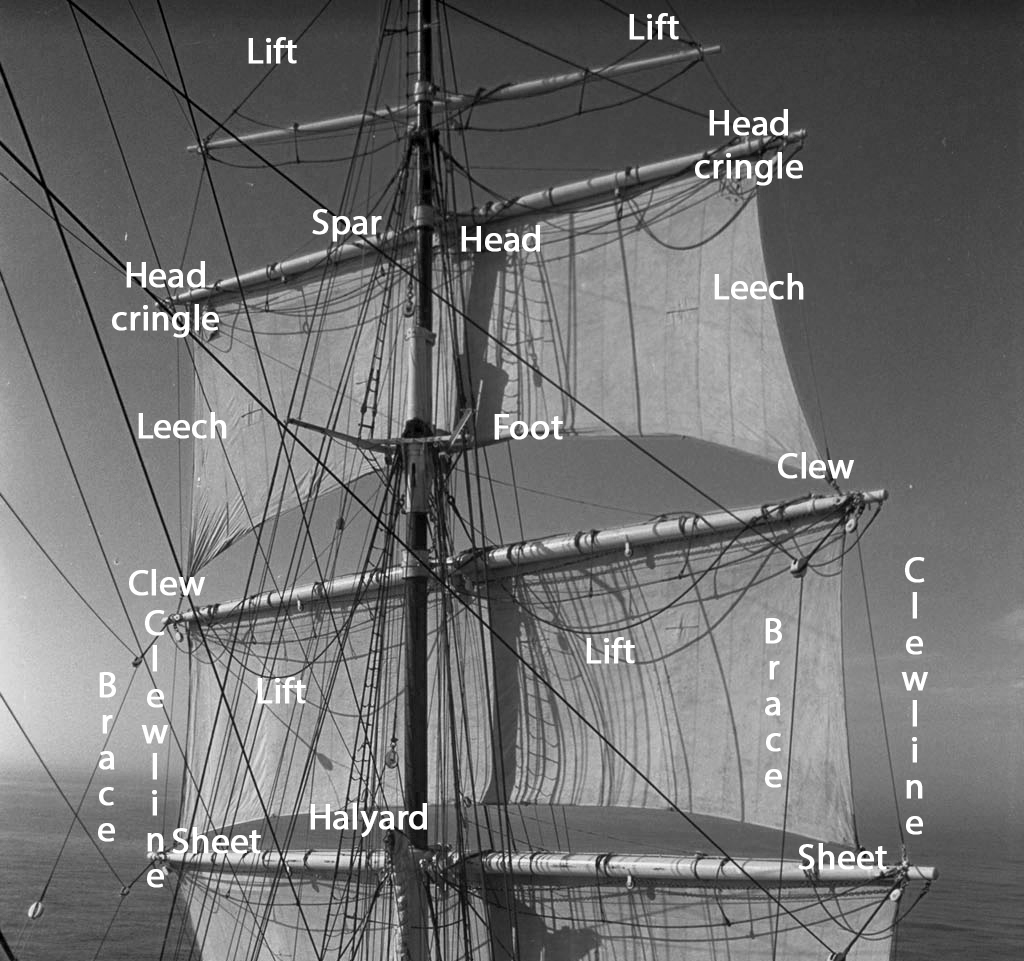
Square sail edges and corners (top). Running rigging (bottom).

Sailing ships have standing rigging to support the masts and running rigging to raise the sails and control their ability to draw power from the wind. The running rigging has three main roles, to support the sail structure, to shape the sail and to adjust its angle to the wind. Square-rigged vessels require more controlling lines than fore-and-aft rigged ones.

==== Standing rigging ====
Sailing ships prior to the mid-19th century used wood masts with hemp-fiber standing rigging. As rigs became taller by the end of the 19th century, masts relied more heavily on successive spars, stepped one atop the other to form the whole, from bottom to top: the lower mast, top mast, and topgallant mast. This construction relied heavily on support by a complex array of stays and shrouds. Each stay in either the fore-and-aft or athwartships direction had a corresponding one in the opposite direction providing counter-tension. Fore-and-aft the system of tensioning started with the stays that were anchored in front each mast. Shrouds were tensioned by pairs of deadeyes, circular blocks that had the large-diameter line run around them, whilst multiple holes allowed smaller line—lanyard—to pass multiple times between the two and thereby allow tensioning of the shroud. After the mid-19th century square-rigged vessels were equipped with iron wire standing rigging, which was superseded with steel wire in the late 19th century.

==== Running rigging ====
Halyards, used to raise and lower the yards, are the primary supporting lines. In addition, square rigs have lines that lift the sail or the yard from which it is suspended that include: brails, buntlines, lifts and leechlines. Bowlines and clew lines shape a square sail. To adjust the angle of the sail to wind braces are used to adjust the fore and aft angle of a yard of a square sail, while sheets attach to the clews (bottom corners) of a sail to control the sail's angle to the wind. Sheets run aft, whereas tacks are used to haul the clew of a square sail forward.

==== Ballast ====
Sailing ships needed ballast to keep the centre of gravity low and supply stability to the vessel when under sail. Ballast in the age of sail might consist of shingle, sand, lead, iron bars or bricks. Care had to be taken in the stowage of the ballast so that it did not move during heavy weather and endanger the ship and those aboard. Sand ballast, for instance, had to be contained by wooden boards, or in wooden boxes, to stop it moving about.

== Crew ==
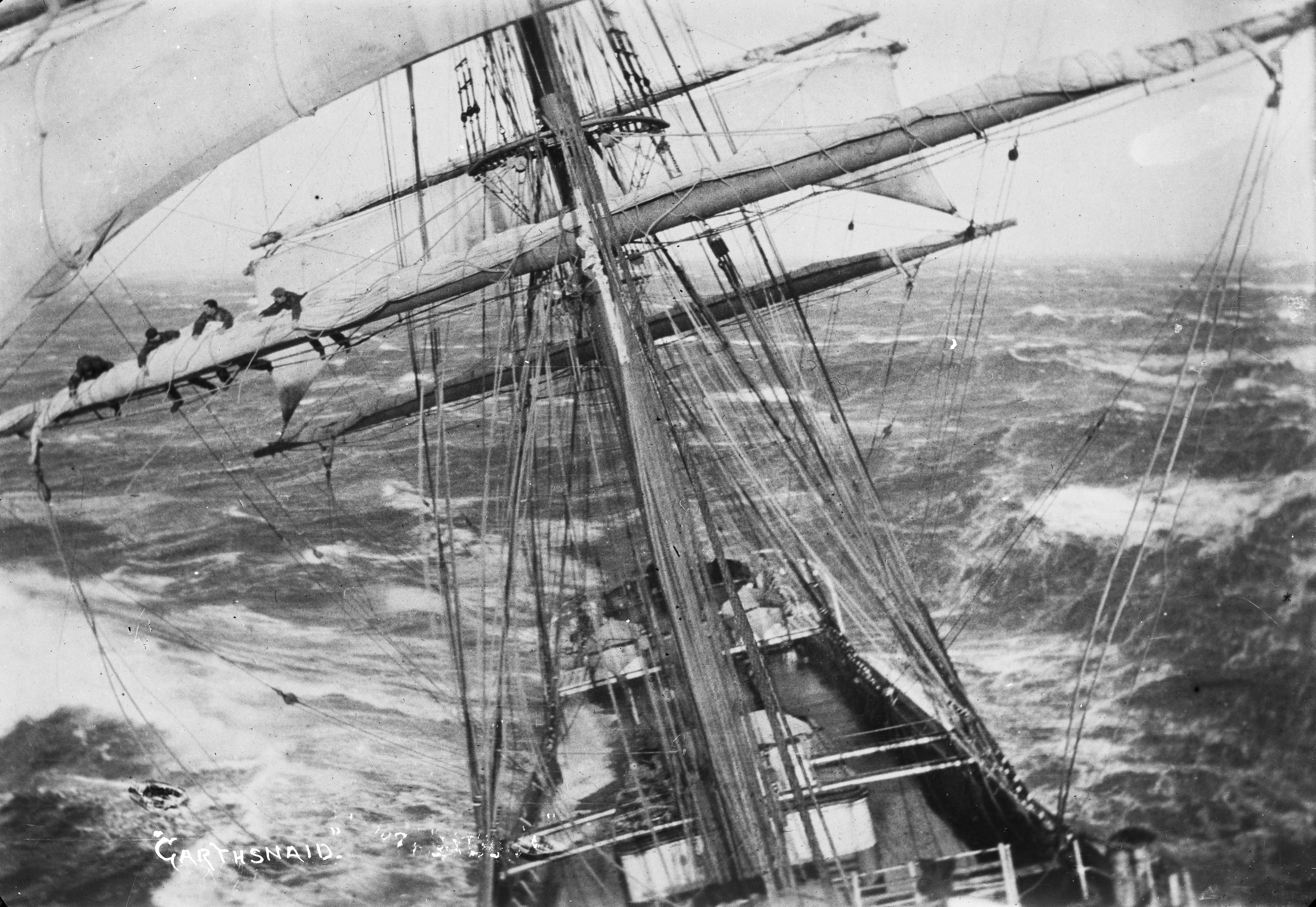
Seamen aloft, stowing a sail

The crew of a sailing ship is divided between officers (the captain and his subordinates) and seamen or ordinary hands. An able seaman was expected to "hand, reef, and steer" (handle the lines and other equipment, reef the sails, and steer the vessel). The crew is organized to stand watch—the oversight of the ship for a period—typically four hours each. Richard Henry Dana Jr. and Herman Melville each had personal experience aboard sailing vessels of the 19th century.

=== Merchant vessel ===
Dana described the crew of the merchant brig, Pilgrim, as comprising six to eight common sailors, four specialist crew members (the steward, cook, carpenter and sailmaker), and three officers: the captain, the first mate and the second mate. He contrasted the American crew complement with that of other nations on whose similarly sized ships the crew might number as many as 30. Larger merchant vessels had larger crews.

=== Warship ===
Melville described the crew complement of the frigate warship, United States, as about 500—including officers, enlisted personnel and 50 Marines. The crew was divided into the starboard and larboard watches. It was also divided into three tops, bands of crew responsible for setting sails on the three masts; a band of sheet-anchor men, whose station was forward and whose job was to tend the fore-yard, anchors and forward sails; the after guard, who were stationed aft and tended the mainsail, spanker and manned the various sheets, controlling the position of the sails; the waisters, who were stationed midships and had menial duties attending the livestock, etc.; and the holders, who occupied the lower decks of the vessel and were responsible for the inner workings of the ship. He additionally named such positions as, boatswains, gunners, carpenters, coopers, painters, tinkers, stewards, cooks and various boys as functions on the man-of-war. 18-19th century ships of the line had a complement as high as 850.

== Ship handling ==
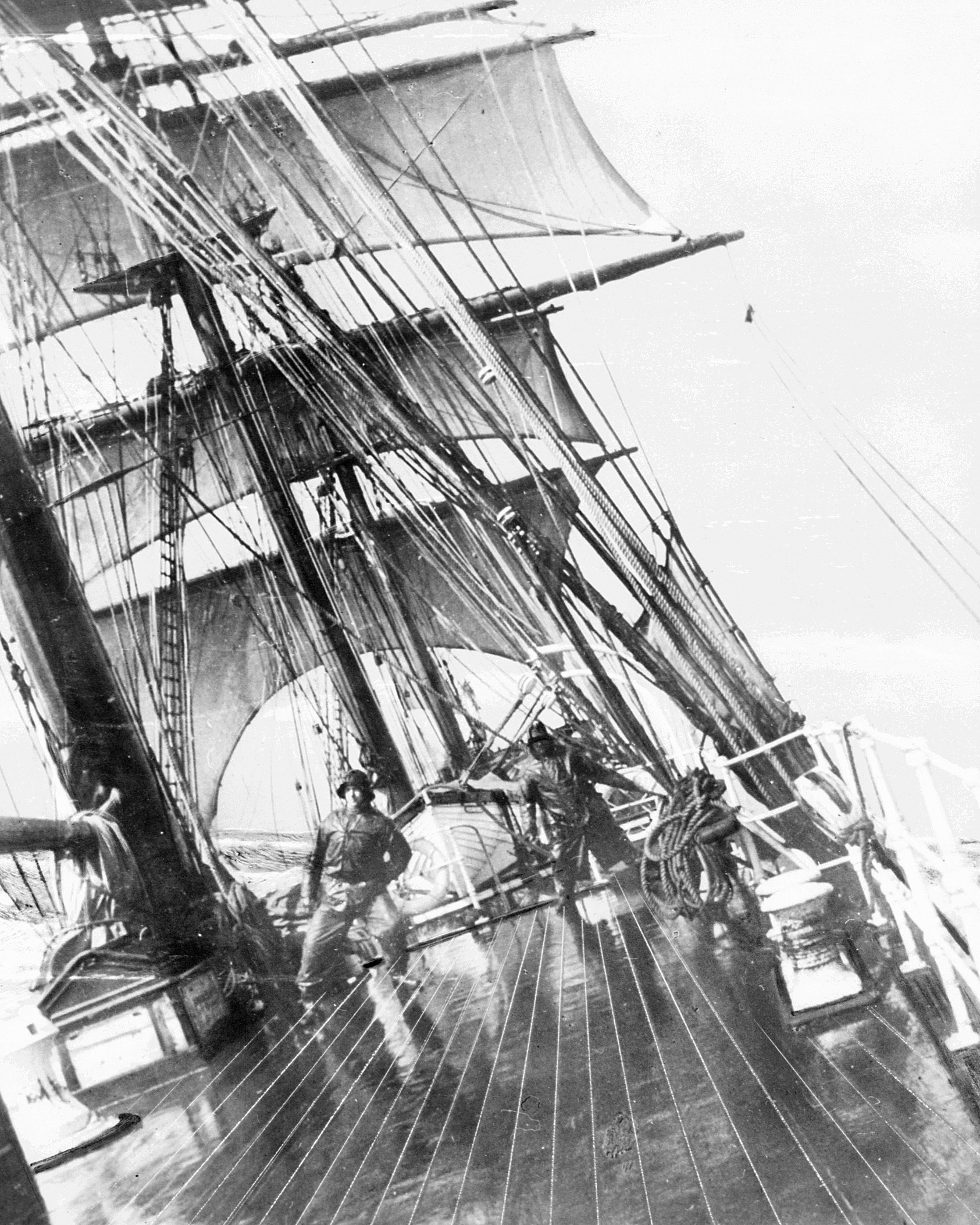
Sailing ship at sea, rolling and heeled over from the force of the wind on its sails.

Handling a sailing ship requires management of its sails to power—but not overpower—the ship and navigation to guide the ship, both at sea and in and out of harbors.

=== Under sail ===
Key elements of sailing a ship are setting the right amount of sail to generate maximum power without endangering the ship, adjusting the sails to the wind direction on the course sailed, and changing tack to bring the wind from one side of the vessel to the other.

==== Setting sail ====
A sailing ship crew manages the running rigging of each square sail. Each sail has two sheets that control its lower corners, two braces that control the angle of the yard, two clewlines, four buntlines and two reef tackles. All these lines must be manned as the sail is deployed and the yard raised. They use a halyard to raise each yard and its sail; then they pull or ease the braces to set the angle of the yard across the vessel; they pull on sheets to haul lower corners of the sail, clews, out to yard below. Under way, the crew manages reef tackles, haul leeches, reef points, to manage the size and angle of the sail; bowlines pull the leading edge of the sail (leech) taut when close hauled. When furling the sail, the crew uses clewlines, haul up the clews and buntlines to haul up the middle of sail up; when lowered, lifts support each yard.

In strong winds, the crew is directed to reduce the number of sails or, alternatively, the amount of each given sail that is presented to the wind by a process called reefing. To pull the sail up, seamen on the yardarm pull on reef tackles, attached to reef cringles, to pull the sail up and secure it with lines, called reef points. Dana spoke of the hardships of sail handling during high wind and rain or with ice covering the ship and its rigging.

==== Changing tack ====
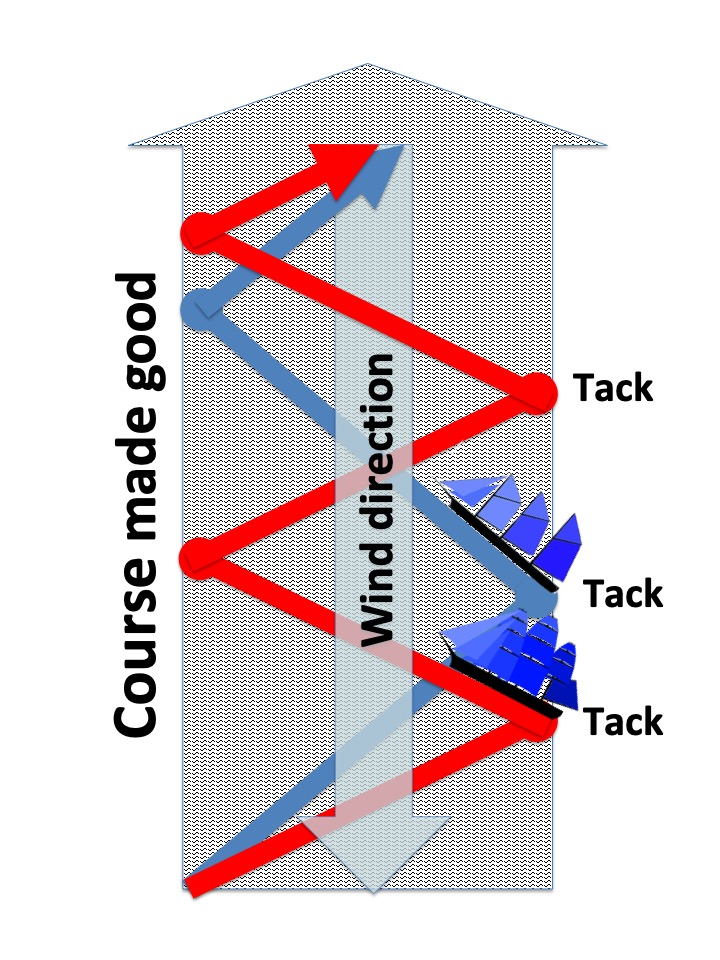
Diagram contrasting course made good to windward by tacking a schooner versus a square-rigged ship.

Sailing vessels cannot sail directly into the wind. Instead, square-riggers must sail a course that is between 60° and 70° away from the wind direction and fore-and aft vessels can typically sail no closer than 45°. To reach a destination, sailing vessels may have to change course and allow the wind to come from the opposite side in a procedure, called tacking, when the wind comes across the bow during the maneuver.

When tacking, a square-rigged vessel's sails must be presented squarely to the wind and thus impede forward motion as they are swung around via the yardarms through the wind as controlled by the vessel's running rigging, using braces—adjusting the fore and aft angle of each yardarm around the mast—and sheets attached to the clews (bottom corners) of each sail to control the sail's angle to the wind. The procedure is to turn the vessel into the wind with the hind-most fore-and-aft sail (the spanker), pulled to windward to help turn the ship through the eye of the wind. Once the ship has come about, all the sails are adjusted to align properly with the new tack. Because square-rigger masts are more strongly braced from behind than from ahead, tacking is a dangerous procedure in strong winds; the ship may lose forward momentum (become caught in stays) and the rigging may fail from the wind coming from ahead. The ship may also lose momentum at wind speeds of less than 10 knots (19 km/h). Under these conditions, the choice may be to wear ship—to turn the ship away from the wind and around 240° onto the next tack (60° off the wind).

A fore-and-aft rig permits the wind to flow past the sail, as the craft head through the eye of the wind. Most rigs pivot around a stay or the mast, while this occurs. For a jib, the old leeward sheet is released as the craft heads through the wind and the old windward sheet is tightened as the new leeward sheet to allow the sail to draw wind. Mainsails are often self-tending and slide on a traveler to the opposite side. On certain rigs, such as lateens and luggers, the sail may be partially lowered to bring it to the opposite side.

=== Navigation ===
The marine sextant is used to measure the elevation of celestial bodies above the horizon.

Early navigational techniques employed observations of the sun, stars, waves and birdlife. In the 15th century, the Chinese were using the magnetic compass to identify direction of travel. By the 16th century in Europe, navigational instruments included the quadrant, the astrolabe, cross staff, dividers and compass. By the time of the Age of Exploration these tools were being used in combination with a log to measure speed, a lead line to measure soundings, and a lookout to identify potential hazards. Later, an accurate marine sextant became standard for determining latitude and was used with an accurate chronometer to calculate longitude.

Passage planning begins with laying out a route along a chart, which comprises a series of courses between fixes—verifiable locations that confirm the actual track of the ship on the ocean. Once a course has been set, the person at the helm attempts to follow its direction with reference to the compass. The navigator notes the time and speed at each fix to estimate the arrival at the next fix, a process called dead reckoning. For coast-wise navigation, sightings from known landmarks or navigational aids may be used to establish fixes, a process called pilotage. At sea, sailing ships used celestial navigation on a daily schedule, as follows:

1. Continuous dead reckoning plot
2. Star observations at morning twilight for a celestial fix
3. Morning Sun observation to determine compass error by azimuth observation of the Sun
4. Noontime observation of the Sun for noon latitude line for determination the day's run and day's set and drift
5. Afternoon sun line to determine compass error by azimuth observation of the Sun
6. Star observations at evening twilight for a celestial fix

Fixes were taken with a marine sextant, which measures the distance of the celestial body above the horizon.

=== Entering and leaving harbor ===
Given the limited maneuverability of sailing ships, it could be difficult to enter and leave harbor with the presence of a tide without coordinating arrivals with a flooding tide and departures with an ebbing tide. In harbor, a sailing ship stood at anchor, unless it needed to be loaded or unloaded at a dock or pier, in which case it might be warped alongside or towed by a tug. Warping involved using a long rope (the warp) between the ship and a fixed point on the shore. This was pulled on by a capstan on shore, or on the ship. This might be a multi-stage process if the route was not simple. If no fixed point was available, a kedge anchor might be taken out in a ship's boat to a suitable point and the ship then pulled up to the kedge. Square rigged vessels could use backing and filling (of the sails) to manoeuvre in a tideway, or control could be maintained by drudging the anchor - lower the anchor until it touches the bottom so that the dragging anchor gives steerage way in the flow of the tide.

== Examples ==
These are examples of sailing ships; some terms have multiple meanings:

Defined by general configuration

- Caravel: small maneuverable ship, lateen rigged
- Carrack: three or four masted ship, square-rigged forward, lateen-rigged aft
- Clipper: a merchant ship designed specifically for speed
- Cog: plank-built, one-masted, square-rigged vessel
- Dhow: a lateen-rigged merchant or fishing vessel
- Djong: large tradeship used by ancient Indonesian and Malaysian people
- Fluyt: a Dutch oceangoing merchant vessel, rigged similarly to a galleon
- Galleon: a large, primarily square-rigged, armed cargo carrier of the sixteenth and seventeenth centuries
- Junk: a lug-rigged Chinese ship, which included many types, models and variants.
- Koch: small, Russian clinker-built ship, designed for use in Arctic waters
- Longship: vessels used by the Vikings, with a single mast and square sail, also propelled by oars.
- Pinisi: Indonesia's traditional sailing ship
- Pink: in the Atlantic, a small oceangoing ship with a narrow stern.
- Snow: a brig carrying a square mainsail and often a spanker on a trysail mast
- Sailing superyacht: a large sailing yacht
- Waʻa kaulua: Polynesian double-hulled voyaging canoe
- Windjammer: (informal) large merchant sailing ship with an iron or steel hull

Defined by sail plan

All masts have fore-and-aft sails

- Schooner: fore-and-aft rigged sails, with two or more masts, the aftermost mast taller or equal to the height of the forward mast(s)

All masts have square sails

- Brig: two masts, square rigged (may have a spanker on the aftermost)
- Full-rigged ship: three or more masts, all of them square rigged

Mixture of masts with square sails and masts with fore-and-aft sails

- Barque, or "bark": at least three masts, fore-and-aft rigged mizzen mast
- Barquentine: at least three masts with all but the foremost fore-and-aft rigged
- Bilander: a ship or brig with a lug-rigged mizzen sail
- Brigantine: two masts, with the foremast square-rigged
- Hermaphrodite brig: a brigantine

Military vessels

- Corvette: lightly armed, fast sailing vessel
- Cutter: small naval vessel, fore-and-aft rigged, single mast with two headsails
- Frigate: a ship-rigged warship with a single gundeck
- Ship of the line: the largest warship in European navies, ship-rigged
- Xebec: a Mediterranean warship adapted from a galley, with three lateen-rigged masts

== See also ==
- List of large sailing vessels
- Sailboat
- Sailing ship accidents
- Sailing ship effect—describing the transition between an old and new technology
- Sailing ship tactics
- Shipbuilding
- Tall ship
