= Oleg Burlakov =

Russian oligarch (1949–2021)

- Born: 24 August 1949; Leningrad, USSR
- Died: 21 June 2021 (aged 71); Łapino, Moscow Region, Russia
- Occupation: Businessman

Oleg Leonidovich Burlakov (Russian: Олег Леонидович Бурлаков; 24 August 1949 – 21 June 2021) was a Russian oligarch, engineer and billionaire. He was also the co-owner of Stroylesbank, the main shareholder of the Burneftegaz company (85%), the former owner and chairman of the board of Novoroscement, the owner of the Terpentin paint and varnish factory in Višegrad and the Impulse Investment and Construction Company.

In 2021, Burlakov was ranked 177th in the Russian Forbes list with a fortune of nearly 3 billion pounds. In the same year, he died from COVID-19.

== Biography ==
Oleg Burlakov was born in Leningrad in 1949. He graduated from school in the village of Bagerovo near Kerch. Burlakov's father was transferred to serve in a military unit engaged in the development of means of delivering atomic weapons to test sites such as those in Semipalatinsk and Novaya Zemlya. Upon finishing his preliminary education, Oleg Burlakov entered the Kiev military aviation school. In 1972, Burlakov became an officer in the Soviet Air Force. He devoted most of his time to scientific research and was involved in secret military research for the aviation and space industries.

In 1980, he successfully defended his dissertation and became a Candidate of Technical Sciences at the Zhukovsky Air Force Engineering Academy.

He then served in Kharkov as head of the Department of Aircraft Equipment Operation at the Higher Military Aviation Engineering School.

In 1989, he left military service on moral grounds, a few years after which he and his family moved to Canada.

In 2018, someone attempted to assassinate the businessman in Moscow. The Police learned that an unknown man ran up to Burlakov while he was sitting in a Cadillac Escalade, and called out to him. When the businessman rolled down his window, the man fired several shots in the direction of the car. However, no one was injured in the incident. Burlakov told police in 2018 that his wife may be involved in the murder attempt.

In the same year, Oleg Burlakov was hospitalized, and arsenic was found in his body, suggesting an attempted poisoning. The businessman attributed the attempts to a conflict over the division of property during his divorce proceedings and the alleged embezzlement of family funds by his wife Lyudmila Burlakova (Marchenko), who had filed for divorce in December 2018.

Oleg Burlakov had been living in Monaco, where he had received a residence permit in 2011. The businessman also had a Canadian passport.

=== Death ===
Oleg Burlakov died on June 21, 2021, in the Lapino clinic near Moscow after battling COVID-19.

The businessman's sister Vera Kazakova wanted to bury him at the Serafimovsky Cemetery in St. Petersburg, where the graves of his mother, father and grandmother are located and where Burlakov himself, according to Kazakova, wanted to be buried. However, the businessman's widow Lyudmila Burlakova and her daughters Veroniсa and Elena insisted on burying the body in Canada, despite that, according to Izvestia, they never visited Oleg Burlakov in the hospital. Kazakova claims that throughout the course of the businessman's illness, none of Burlakov's immediate family asked for information about his state of health. However, representatives of Burlakov's wife and daughters have stated that they did request such information.

The authorities refused to release the body to Vera Kazakova. Later, people who introduced themselves as lawyers of Lyudmila Burlakova removed the body from the morgue.

Vera Kazakova demanded the Investigative Committee check on the circumstances of her brother's death and find out whether the mortuary staff had the right to refuse to give her his body.

The deceased was moved to another morgue by order of the investigator, but Burlakov's widow appealed the decision. The body was eventually taken by the lawyers again.

In February 2021, potential violations in the removal of the body were being investigated and the issue of initiating a criminal case was being studied. In October 2021, the circumstances of the removal of Oleg Burlakov's body abroad began and were analyzed by the Solntsevsky interdistrict investigative department (Investigative Directorate, the Western Administrative District of Moscow). The inspection showed that Vnukovo customs officers had accepted false documents in regard to the export of the billionaire's body, as a result of which, the body was sent to Switzerland, and then to Canada.

Oleg Burlakov was buried in Toronto, Canada, on July 16, 2021.

However, according to the magazine Kompaniya, Burlakov's body was buried in the columbarium wall without an identification plate.

== Scientific activities ==
Burlakov is the author of more than 30 scientific publications and more than 5 scientific inventions, for which he was awarded the title "Honored Inventor of the USSR". One of his works was awarded with a diploma of the Commander-in-Chief of the Air Forces.

He was the author of methodological recommendations for correspondence students for the course "Fundamentals of Radio-Electronics". He was the co-author of a textbook for the Air Force Academy entitled "Fundamentals of Radio-Electronics", the textbook "Aviation equipment", and the textbook "Fundamentals of Aviation Electronics Radio-Electronics", as well as the creator of methodological recommendations for conducting the military training of cadets at the Faculty of Aviation Equipment, the Kharkov Higher Military Aviation Engineering School of the Red Banner.

=== Scientific works ===
- "Assessment of the reliability of complex structures for the construction of control and diagnostic algorithms", article
- "On the issue of the development of ring thyristor three-phase current inverters", article, co-authored with Davidov P.D. and Starkov G.N.
- "On one method of construction of essential diagnostic matrices", article, co-authored with Bakulin S.N. and Starkov G.N.
- "On the mathematical modeling of the constant velocity hydro-mechanical drive", co-authored with Bakulin S.N.
- "Prediction of technical condition of hydro-mechanical constant speed drives", article
- "On choosing of predictive parameters of hydro-mechanical drives of a constant speed", article
- "On the issue of mathematical modeling of the contactless direct current valve oscillator taking into account the nonlinear approximation of a magnetization curve", article, co-authored with Kapustin A.G. and others
- "Formalized method of the calculation of magnetic circuits of electric machines", article, co-authored with Kosnevich A.G. and others
- "Ways to increase cognitive activity of cadets during military internship", report, co-authored with Yakunin G.V. and others
- "On the calculation of electric machines with reciprocating armature", article, co-authored with Makarevich V. S.

Most of the scientific projects that Oleg Burlakov worked on are confidential, but it is known that he worked on:

- researching issues of applying the on-board digital computers for the purposes of regulation, control and protection of power supply systems
- developing software for a digital control system for an aircraft AC power with alternating current of constant frequency
- a study of potential improvements to practical training for cadets of the Faculty of Aviation Equipment, the Kharkov Higher military aviation engineering school of the Red Banner, during the practice period
- exploring the possibilities of the application of high-frequency currents for nondestructive control of insulating coatings of conductive elements of the power supply system of aircraft

== Business ==
=== Fuel systems manufacturing ===
In 1989, Burlakov, together with Nikolai Ivanovich Kazakov, Candidate of Geological and Mineralogical Sciences, geochemical engineer and entrepreneur (and the husband of Burlakov's sister Vera) organized the multi-profile cooperative scientific-production association "Integral" in Kharkov, which was engaged in the development of fuel systems for the Soviet military industry and parts for spacecraft. Burlakov was personally involved in the development of the company, which became one of the largest companies engaged in such work in the 1990s.

=== Oil industry ===
In the 1990s, together with N. I. Kazakov, he created Sovinterfrance, a Soviet-French joint venture in Kharkov.

Activities began with the construction of refrigerated warehouses. Burlakov then decided to reorient the company and move into trade: it purchased submersible oil pumps from Kharkov Electromechanical Plant and sent them to Russia in exchange for oil. In 1992, the Sovinterfrance company opened a branch in St. Petersburg and exported 217 thousand tons of Russian oil. A year later, the company opened a subsidiary and the Ukrainian Sovinterfrance was closed.

In 2005, Oleg Burlakov, together with Pavel Mitrofanov, founded Burneftegaz, a company that bought up oil fields at auctions. Burlakov was involved in attracting investment to expand the business. As a result of his efforts, 8 development licenses were obtained, and in 2013, oil and gas condensate production amounted to 291,975 tons.

In 2014, Mitrofanov left Russia, accused of offering a 5 million ruble bribe, at which point Burlakov decided to sell Burneftegaz. Burlakov's investments amounted to $700 million, 85% of which were borrowed funds. The company was sold to Bashneft for $1 billion, about $600 million of which went to pay off debts. Burlakov received about $360 million for his 85% share. The businessman invested most of the money in financial instruments.

=== Cement production ===
In 1992, Oleg Leonidovich and his companions received control over the Belgorod Cement Plant, investing around $500 thousand. They eventually sold the plant in 2003.

In November 1993, companies belonging to Burlakov and Kazakov acquired shares of the cement giant Novoroscement at a voucher auction. The holding consisted of three plants with a capacity of more than 4 million tons of cement a year, 1 million tons of which was exported. In 2003, the businessman obtained a controlling interest by buying out a 31.7% stake from Holderbank.

In 2007, Burlakov and Kazakov sold Novoroscement for $1.2 billion to Lev Kvetnoy, another Russian businessman on the Forbes list. Burlakov was directly involved in the strategic development and management of the company. As a result of his decisions, by 2007, the cement output of Novoroscement had increased by 1.3 mln tons in comparison with 2003 (when Burlakov took over the controlling interest), reaching 3.8 mln tons.

=== Other ===
In the 1990s, Oleg Burlakov was an entrepreneur who, in partnership with Kazakov, successfully bought and sold assets in different industries. In 1998, they acquired the Roscem – a berth and cargo unit in Ust-Luga in Leningrad Oblast.

In 2008, they purchased Krasnodarpromzheldortrans in Krasnodar.

In the same year, Burlakov privatized the Terpentin paint and varnish factory in Višegrad, and in 2012, he concessioned a lignite and bentonite deposit in Serbia, investing about 23.5 million convertible marks.

Burlakov also invested in real estate development and construction, a market he was brought into by Alexander Kripak, former deputy chief of the Navy. He also invested in Karelian platinoids mining at the invitation of Vladimir Grishaenko, a former KGB handler for Gokhran.

As of 2014, he owned a 74.88% share in Stroylesbank and a 20.99% share in Krasnodarpromzheldortrans. As of 2021, he officially owned the transportation company Krasnodarpromzheldortrans, the "Kalinka" business center including "Tyumen Hilton" hotel in it in the downtown of Tyumen, and Stroylesbank.

== Black Pearl (yacht) ==
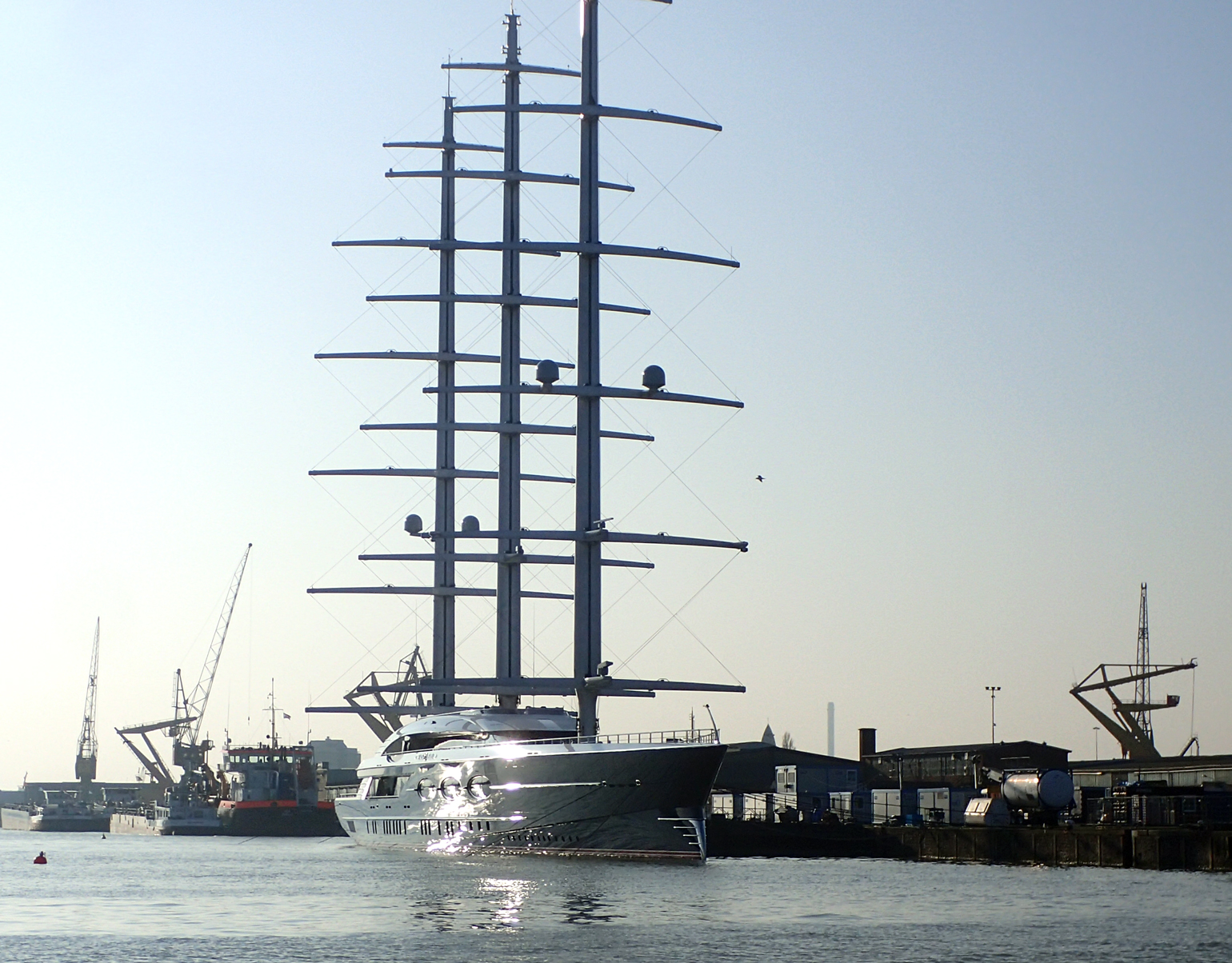
Black Pearl (yacht)

Oleg Burlakov has been fond of ship modeling since childhood and for a long time nurtured the idea of building his own boat. In 2005, after reading the news about the first flexible liquid-crystal solar batteries, the businessman had the idea to use solar batteries instead of sails. Burlakov considered his yacht a scientific project and prototype, planning to later apply the technology to develop cargo ships powered by alternative energy sources. To this end, Burlakov had successfully negotiated with representatives of the United Shipbuilding Corporation about using these developments in Russia.

In the implementation of this design, Burlakov worked with the English designer Ken Freivokh, who developed the Maltese Falcon in 2006, a yacht with a unique 15-square-sail system that can be set up in only six minutes. A similar sailing system was installed on Burlakov's yacht, the Black Pearl, but with flexible solar panels integrated into the fabric of the sails.

Construction on the yacht began in 2010. By 2018, Oleg Burlakov had invested more than €250 million euros in its design and creation, of which €150 million were loans from European banks. The total amount of investments is estimated to be between €250 and €400 million euros.

Burlakov was directly involved at every stage of the creation of the yacht. Among other things, he invented a mechanism for the masts, which he began patenting in 2018. Burlakov gave considerable attention to ecology in the construction of the ship: the water on board is reused and the team uses treated sewage to wash the floors. It features separated garbage collection, reusable packages, and a minimum of plastic and chemicals - the "environmental policy" on board is very strict.

The Black Pearl was finally launched in 2016 and is the only vessel in the world capable of storing energy from alternative sources and utilizing them.

== Family ==
Burlakov's mother was a medical worker, and his father was a military engineer. His sister Vera is an economic engineer married to Burlakov's business partner Nikolai Kazakov.

Burlakov was married to Lyudmila Burlakova. Together they had two daughters: Elena and Veronica.

In 2018, Lyudmila Burlakova began divorce proceedings in Monaco. The divorce was supposed to be finalized at the end of the summer of 2021, but the businessman died before it was completed.

== UK court claim ==
In 2020, Lyudmila Burlakova filed a civil claim against her husband in the High Court of England and Wales. In addition to her husband, 12 individuals and entities were included as defendants, including Leo Trust, a corporate services provider for the various entities created by Oleg Burlakov.

== Inheritance claims ==
Oleg Burlakov's estate has been the subject of litigation in multiple jurisdictions. His widow Lyudmila Burlakova and their daughters have contested claims by his sister Vera Kazakova and her husband, Nikolai Kazakov. Inheritance claims are also being made by Sofia Shevtsova, acting on behalf of her minor daughter, whose father is allegedly Burlakov. Shevtsova filed a lawsuit to establish that Oleg Burlakov was indeed her daughter's father. After his death, a will was found, that was handwritten and dated 2019. The validity of the 2019 document remains disputed in the ongoing Monaco proceedings. Latvian authorities initiated a criminal investigation against Sofia Shevtsova, Ludmila Burlakova and Elena Burlakova, as well as their local affiliate notary Ingūna Bobrovska, for an alleged conspiracy to seize assets of Oleg Burlakov by way of obtaining an inheritance certificate based on fraud.
