= Maltese Falcon (yacht) =

Luxury yacht and full-rigged ship

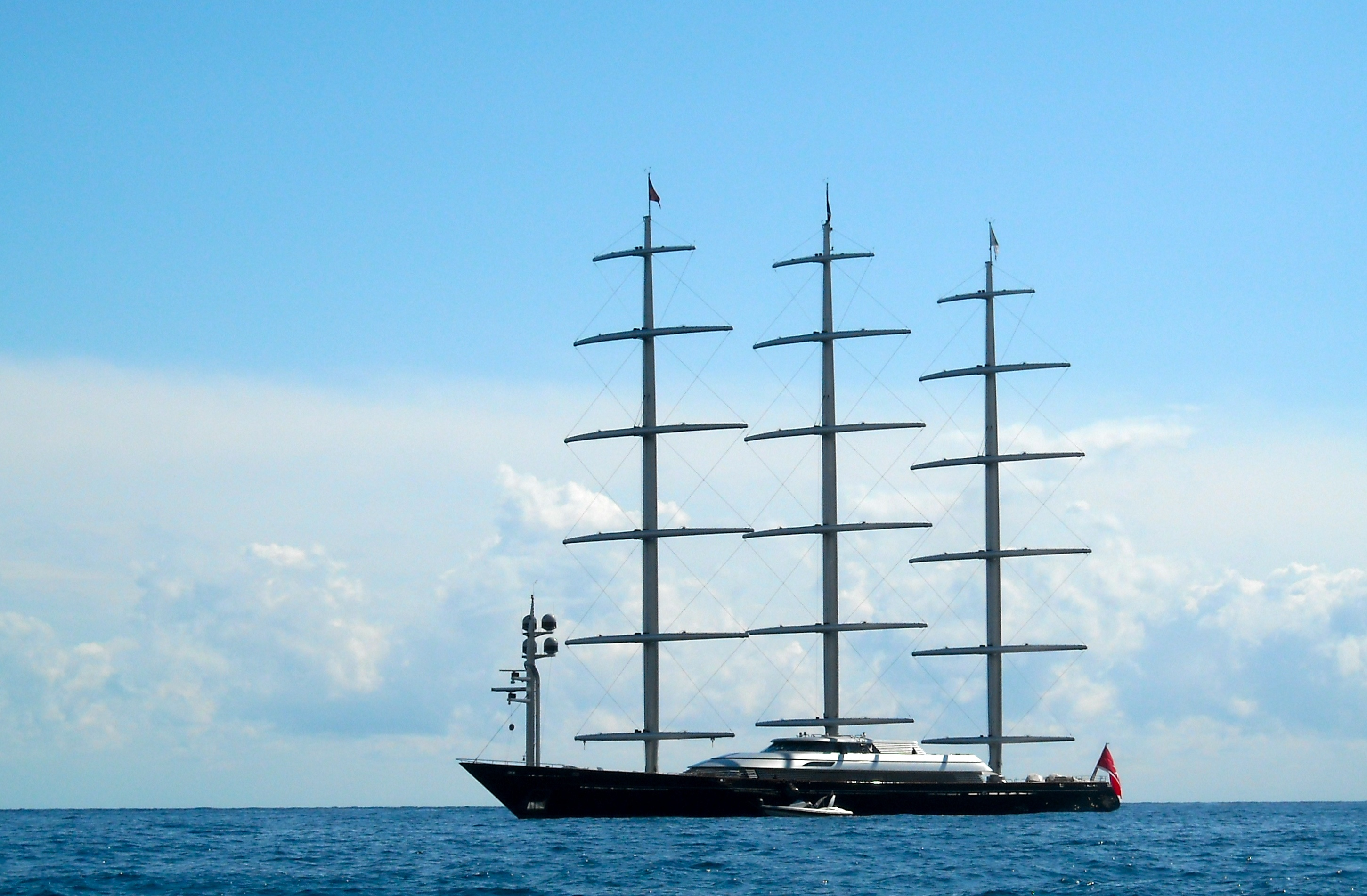
- Maltese Falcon

History

Malta
- Name: Maltese Falcon
- Namesake: The Maltese Falcon
- Owner: Thomas Perkins (2006–2008); Pleon Ltd (2008–)
- Operator: Pleon Ltd., Tortola, BVI
- Builder: Perini Navi, Dearsan Shipyards, Tuzla, Istanbul
- Launched: 1990
- Completed: 2006-02-06
- Identification: IMO number: 9384552; MMSI number: 249555000; Callsign: 9HUQ9
- Yacht design: Dykstra Naval Architects

General characteristics
- Type: sailing yacht
- Tonnage: 1,157 GT
- Displacement: 1,240 t (1,220 long tons; 1,367 short tons)
- Length: 88.10 m (289 ft)
- Beam: 12.60 m (41 ft)
- Height: 58.20 m (191 ft)
- Draught: 6.00–11.00 m (20–36 ft)
- Propulsion: 2 × 1,524kW Deutz TBD 620 V12 at 1,800rpm
- Sail plan: self-standing three-mast square rigger; sail area 2,396 m^{2} (25,790 sq ft)
- Capacity: 12 guests
- Crew: 18 persons

Maltese Falcon is a full-rigged ship using DynaRig technology, which was built by Perini Navi in Tuzla, Istanbul, and commissioned by her first owner, Tom Perkins. She is one of the world's most complex and largest sailing yachts at 88 m (289 ft), similar in size to the Athena and Eos. The vessel dropped its British Virgin Islands flag in 2008 and was purchased by Pleon Ltd, which put it to charter use.

== Vessel ==
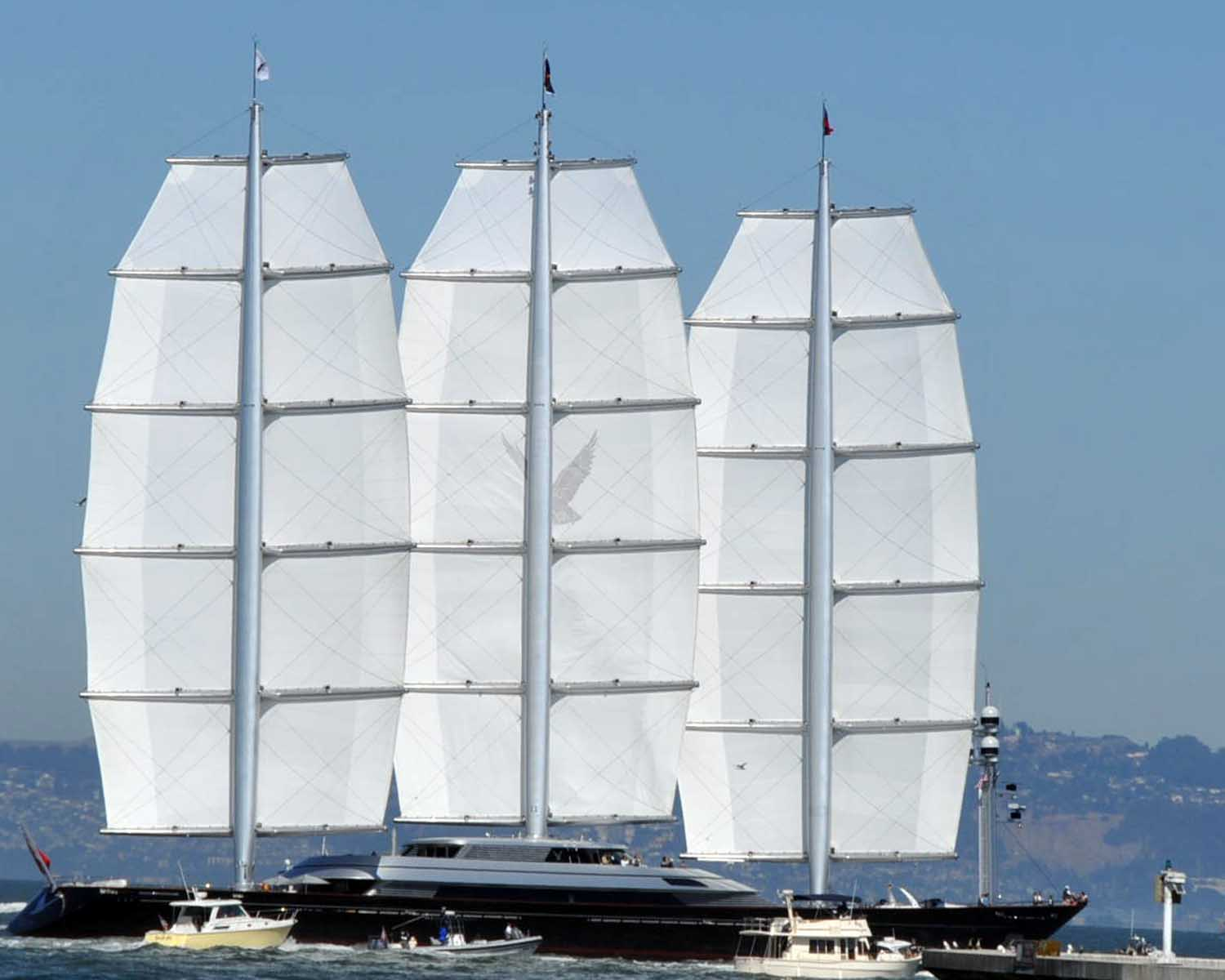
Maltese Falcon under sail (2008)

The bare hull was built and launched on speculation in 1989-1990 by Perini Navi at its newly acquired shipyard in Tuzla, Istanbul, but found no takers in the aftermath of the Gulf War. Tom Perkins, a keen yachtsman and the owner of the two Andromeda La Dea Perini ketches, took an interest in the hull. In 2001 he hired Dutch yacht designers at Dykstra Naval Architects to investigate 19th-century clippers and propose a three-mast square rig for the project. The "DynaRig" concept, a 1960s invention by German hydraulics engineer Wilhelm Prölß intended to operate cargo ships with a fuel-saving philosophy and as few crew as possible, met with Perkins' approval, and the project was signed into build in Tuzla. The three self-standing rotating carbonfiber masts were not a Perini Navi deliverable; they were manufactured and fitted to the yacht at the Perini Navi premises in Tuzla under the direct responsibility of Perkins and the supervision of Insensys, Ltd, a British carbonfiber specialist. Ken Freivokh designed the vessel's interior decoration, and Perini Navi fitted her out. The ship was completed in 2006.

The yacht is easily controlled and has been seen to sail off her anchor and away from berths within harbors. The yacht's sophisticated computer detects parameters such as wind speed automatically and displays key data. An operator must always activate the controls, yet it is possible for a single person to operate the yacht. In a radio interview for the BBC World Service's Global Business programme broadcast in December 2007, Perkins claimed that he personally wrote some of the yacht's unique control software.

On 4 November 2007, in a 60 Minutes profile, Perkins suggested the yacht cost more than $150 million but less than $300 million, refusing to be more specific.

Maltese Falcon is operated as a charter yacht.

== Rig ==
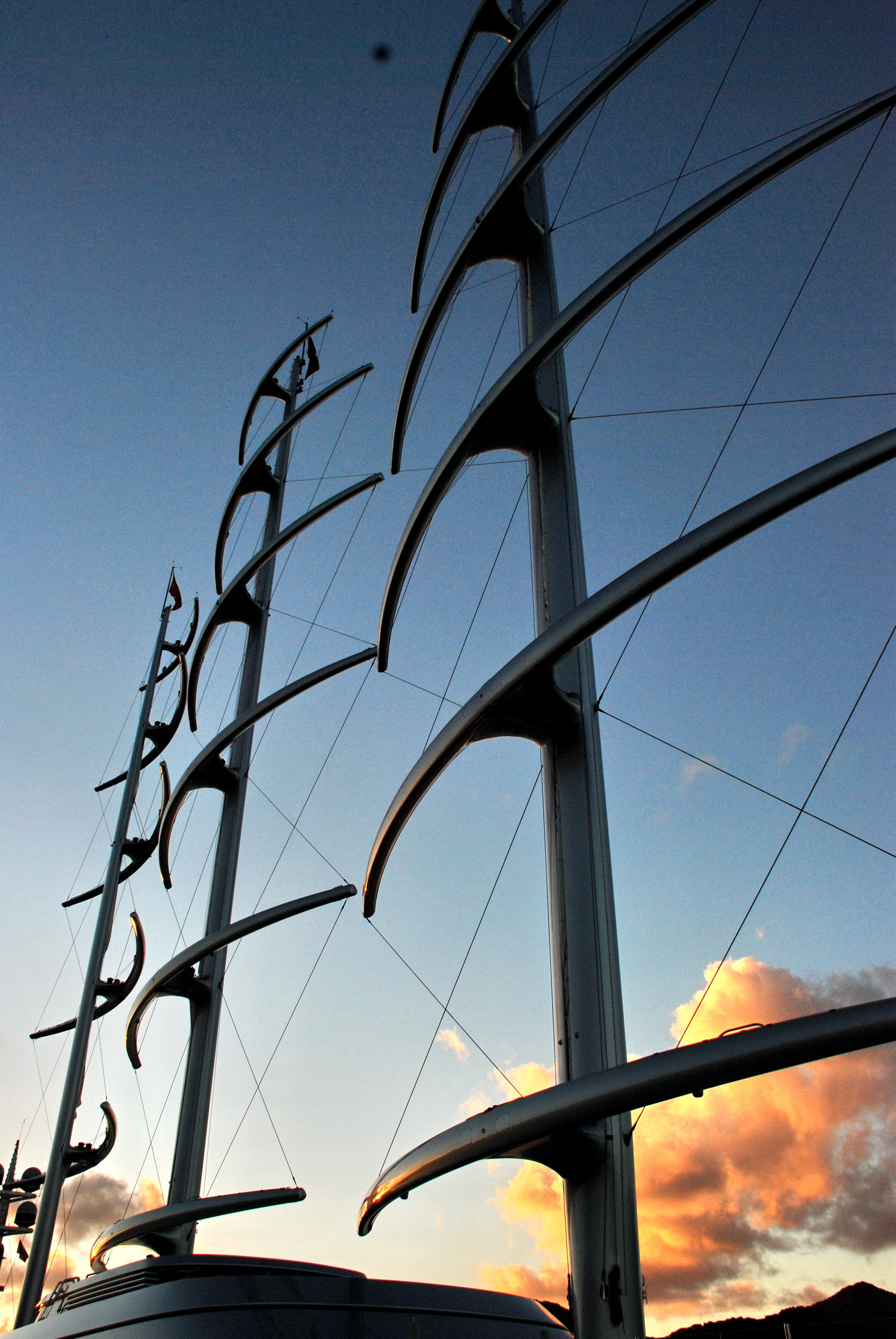
Maltese Falcon' masts

Damon Roberts of Insensys, Ltd. was responsible for designing and manufacturing the DynaRig of Maltese Falcon at the Perini Navi premises in Tuzla, Istanbul. The design, testing and manufacturing of the system was completed over a three-year period. Exhaustive finite element analysis and carbon fiber testing were carried out to ensure that the complete assembly would sustain the loads under sail.

The DynaRig owes its origin to Wilhelm Prölss' research in the 1960s. The DynaRig consists of freestanding rotating masts with rigid yards and acts as a square rig. Each of Maltese Falcon's masts supports six yards, which, unlike a conventional square rigger, have built-in camber of 12%. The fifteen square sails are set between the yards in such a way that when deployed there are no gaps in the sail plan of each mast, enabling them to act as a single airfoil. The furling sails are stored in the mast and can be deployed along tracks on the yards in 6 minutes. The sails are trimmed by rotating the masts. As there is no rigging, the masts and yards can be rotated without restriction for all points of sail, making Maltese Falcon a capable upwind clipper.

The length of the masts measures approximately 57 m (187 ft) above the bottom bearing. As the rig can be tacked to allow flow in both directions, the mast rotates about deck and keel bearings and have symmetrical elliptical sections for better aerodynamics in both flows.

Insensys also incorporated a fiber optical strain monitoring system into the spars to analyse real time loads under sail. A fiber Bragg grating system was embedded during wet layup of the carbonfiber structure. The loads are transmitted to the bridge monitors.

== Prizelist ==
Maltese Falcon has received industry prizes from shipowners and the press. It has also won the Perini Navi Cup regattas on two occasions as well as the Palma Superyacht Cup in 2010.

- 2007 Boat International World SuperYacht Award – Best Sailing Yacht Interior
- 2007 Boat International World SuperYacht Award – Best Sailing Yacht 45m and above
- 2007 Boat International World SuperYacht Award – Sailing Yacht of the Year
- 2007 Showboats international Award – most innovative sailing yacht
- 2007 Showboats international Award – best sailing yacht over 40m
- 2007 Showboats international Award – best sailing yacht interior
- 2007 Showboats international Award – highest technical achievement in a sailing yacht
- 2007 International SuperYacht Society – best sailing yacht over 36m
- 2009 Perini Navi Cup
- 2010 Palma Superyacht Cup
- 2011 Perini Navi Cup
- David A. Kaplan's authorised biography Mine's Bigger: Tom Perkins and the Making of the Greatest Sailing Machine Ever Built won the Gerald Loeb Award for best business book of 2008.
- 2012 Yacht Capital Marina Yachting
- 2013 First Baccarat SuperYacht World trophy - Finest SuperYacht Ever
- 2018 Perini Navi Cup

== History ==
Maltese Falcon was involved in a collision on October 4, 2008, with a 40 ft (12 m) sloop while sailing on the San Francisco Bay during the Leukemia Cup.

Maltese Falcon was still listed for sale in 2009 by Camper & Nicholsons with an asking price of €115m and 1,899 hours logged on the engines when it was reported that it had already dropped flag in 2008 and been sold by Burgess who listed it for €70m.

== See also ==
- Black Pearl (Also DynaRig sailing yacht, 2018)
- List of yachts built by Perini Navi
- List of large sailing yachts
- Luxury yachts
- Yacht
- Sailing yacht
