= Novoroscement =

Major producer of cement in Russia

- Company type: Private
- Industry: Construction Materials
- Founded: 1922
- Headquarters: Novorossiysk, Russia
- Products: Cement
- Revenue: ▲14,051 billion rubles (2008, RBSU)
- Net income: ▲6,296 billion rubles (2008, RBSU)
- Website: www.novoroscement.ru

Novoroscement is a producer of cement with its headquarters located in Novorossiysk, Russia. The company's full name is Открытое акционерное общество Новоросцемент (Joint Stock Company Novoroscement).

== History ==
The company originated in 1882 when the first cement factory in Novorossiysk was launched, named the Black Sea Society Cement Production (now called The Proletariat).

In 1922, the Novoroscement trust was established as part of the restoration of factories that were destroyed during the Russian Civil War. In 1992, the Novoroscement plant was privatised.

== Owners and executives ==
The owner of all the company's shares is the Russian holding company.

Oleg Burlakov played a significant role in company's post-Soviet development.

== Activity ==
The company owns three cement plants in the Krasnodar Territory – The Proletariat, October and Pervomajskij. These plants produce cement from high quality local raw materials, especially marl.

Cement production in 2009 amounted to 3.8 million tons of cement (in 2008 — 4.0 million tons). The company's revenue for 2009 amounted to 7.69 billion rubles. (for 2008 — 14.1 billion rubles), net profit -— 1.29 billion rubles. (6.29 billion rubles). Cement production in 2007 totalled 3.8 million tons, with total revenue of US$400 million and net profit of US$215 million, as reported according to IFRS standards.
