= Carbon fiber testing =

Carbon fiber testing is a set of various different tests that researchers use to characterize the properties of carbon fiber. The results for the testing are used to aid the manufacturer and developers decisions selecting and designing material composites, manufacturing processes and for ensured safety and integrity. Safety-critical carbon fiber components, such as structural parts in machines, vehicles, aircraft or architectural elements are subject to testing.

== Introduction ==
Carbon fiber reinforced plastic and reinforced polymers are gaining importance as light-weight material. There are various disciplines for material testing that especially apply to carbon fiber materials. Most common are destructive tests, such as stress, fatigue and micro sectioning tests. There are also methods that allow non-destructive testing (NDT), so the material can be still be used after testing. Common methods are ultrasonic, X-ray, HF Eddy Current, Radio Wave testing or thermography. Additionally, Structural Health Monitoring (SHM) methods allow testing during application.

== Testing methods ==
=== Destructive Testing ===
Safety-critical carbon fiber parts, such as aircraft frames, need to be tested destructively (e.g. stress, fatigue) and non-destructively (e.g. fiber orientation, delamination and bonding). Three types of destructive testing are micro-sectioning, stress and fatigue tests. A form of fatigue testing for carbon fiber components is very high cycle fatigue (VHCF). Common VHCF test methods are ultrasonic or resonance testing of tension, compression, or torsion. Typically, destructive tests are carried out to validate the mechanical properties, whereas NDT is used to monitor and control the manufacturing process of the CFRP parts.

=== Non-Destructive Testing ===
The aerospace industry relies on thermography testing to help detect defects in the carbon fiber components. Ultrasonic testing of CFRP parts is the most popular form of NDT testing. Ultrasonic testing allows researchers to find any anomalies in the thin laminar composites. Ultrasonic testing only works with parts that are no thicker than 50mm. Radiographic testing utilizes short wavelength electromagnetic radiation. The wavelength is so small that it can penetrate the CFRP while light cannot. X-ray testing can detect voids, porosity, inclusions, trans-laminar cracks, resin-to-fiber ratio, non-uniform fiber distribution and fiber orientation, such as fiber folds, wrinkles or weld lines. A flaw of X-ray testing is if the defect is perpendicular to the x-ray beam, the defect will not be detected. Thermography plays a major role in the aerospace industry. This test is used to detect any defects that could cause the carbon fiber component to fail resulting in a catastrophe. Two types of thermography exist active and passive. Both of these methods save money because the part that is being tested stays intact. They are also efficient because they are able to scan large areas at a time. As carbon fiber composites are highly individual in shape and material composition, novel NDTs are an emerging and sought-for application. Applicable technologies are radio wave testing, high frequency eddy current testing, thermography, shearography, air-coupled laser ultrasonics and terahertz scanning.

== Typical effects and defects ==
The specifications for integrity of structurally relevant parts depend on the individual manufacturer. However, typically relevant quality criteria of the texture are fiber orientation, gaps, wrinkles, overlaps, distortion, undulation, uniformity as well as defects in the matrix delamination, inclusion, cracks, curing, void, debonding. Furthermore, basis weight or carbon fiber volume content are important properties. Generally, defects and effects in carbon fiber materials are classified according to their location as structural defects (carbon fiber related) and matrix defects (resin related). Carbon fiber related effects are tested with X-ray and high frequency testing methods whereas matrix effects are commonly tested with ultrasonic and thermographic methods.

Structural defects	Matrix defects
Distortions & misalignments	Matrix delamination
Wrinkles & overlaps	Inclusions
Fuzzy balls	Voids and pores
Gaps & undulations	Cracks
	Curing
	Debonding
	Hot spots
	Impacts & delaminations

== See also ==
- Carbon-fiber-reinforced polymer
- Carbon (fiber)
- Non-destructive testing
