= Black Pearl (yacht) =

Sailing yacht launched in 2016

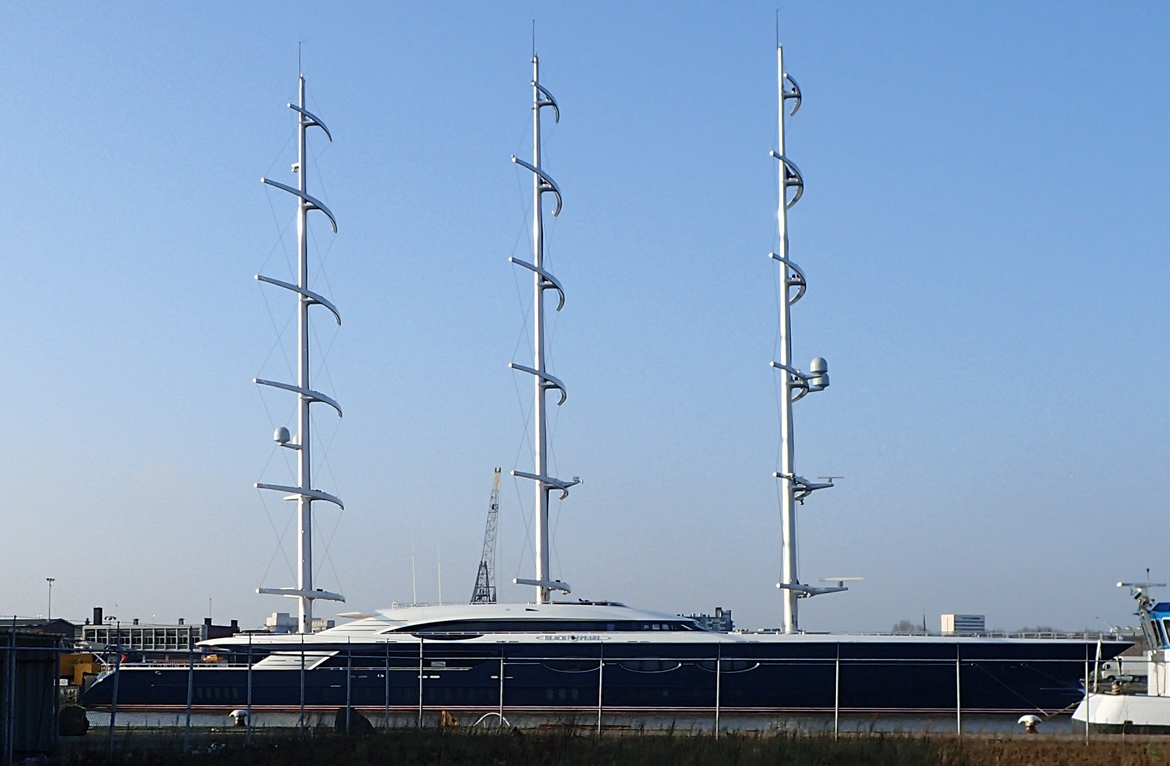
- Black Pearl in Rotterdam in January 2018.

History

Cayman Islands
- Name: Black Pearl
- Owner: Oleg Burlakov
- Builder: Oceanco
- Yard number: Y712
- Launched: 2016
- Completed: 2017
- In service: 2018
- Notes: Call sign: ZGGH7; IMO number: 1012490; MMSI number: 319113100

General characteristics
- Class & type: Lloyd's registered
- Type: Sailing yacht
- Tonnage: 2,864 GT
- Length: 106.7 m (350.1 ft)
- Beam: 15 m (49.2 ft)
- Sail plan: 2,900 m^{2} (31,215 sq ft) DynaRig
- Speed: 30 knots (56 km/h) (Max sail speed)
- Capacity: 12

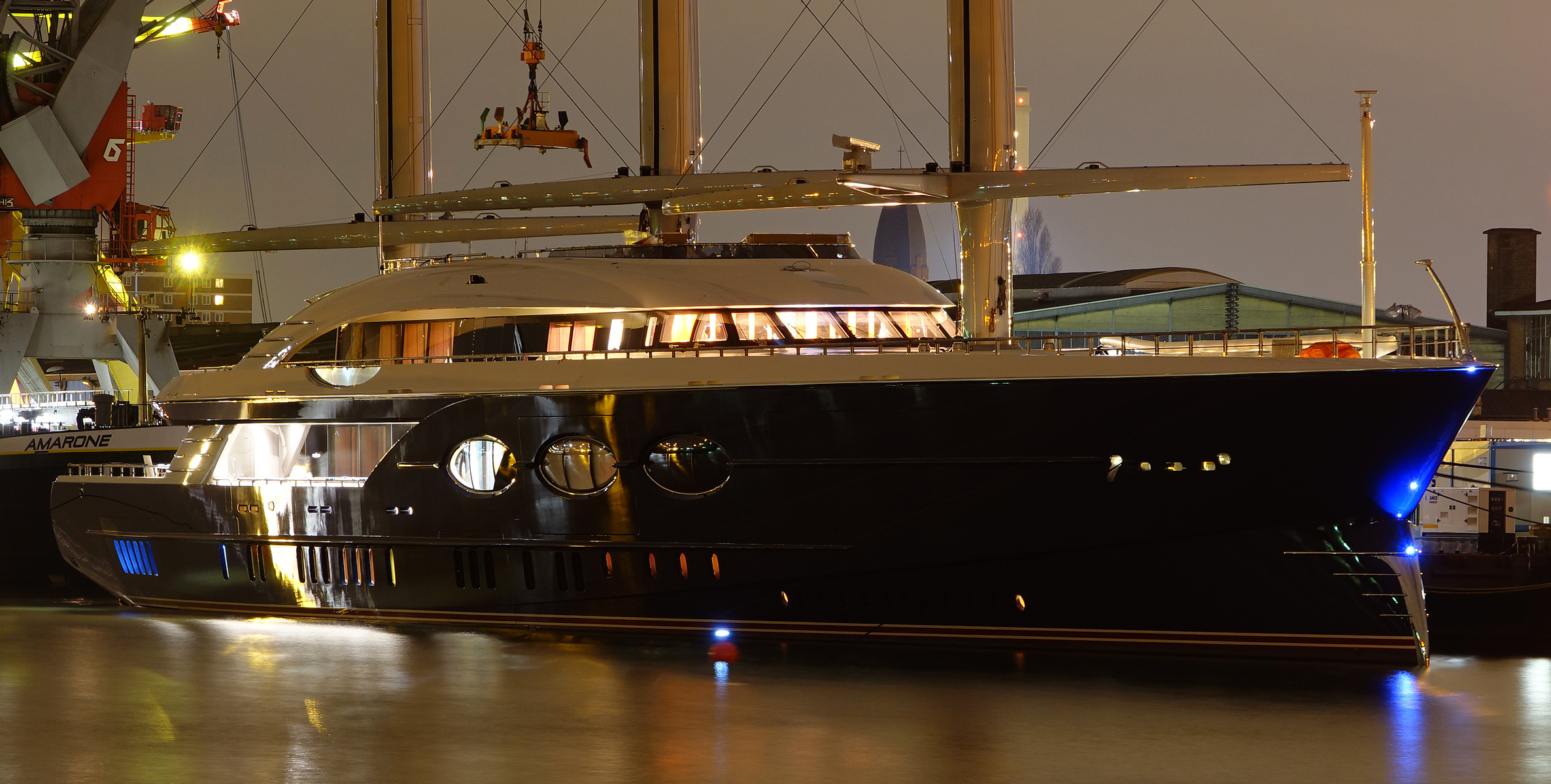
Black Pearl at night

Black Pearl is a sailing yacht launched in 2016, which is 106.7 meters (350.1 ft) in length. It has three DynaRig masts supporting a sail area of 2,900 square meters (31,215 sq ft). The yacht was known during its build process originally as Oceanco Y712 and thereafter as "Project Solar". The hull is steel, the superstructure aluminum, and the masts carbon fiber. The yacht is owned by the family of Russian billionaire Oleg Burlakov, who died in 2021.

As of 2018 when designed, it was expected that Black Pearl could cross the Atlantic using only 20 litres (4.4 imp gal; 5.3 US gal) of fuel, aided by regenerative technologies. One key technology to support this is to use the speed of the vessel through the water under sail to generate electricity with a variable pitch propeller. The yacht also features heat capture technologies and large scale storage batteries to capture energy generated but not immediately used.

== Background ==
In the 21st century, the largest sailing yachts greatly increased in size. In the 1990s, even 40 m (131 ft) long was considered a large boat. Yachts like Athena and Mirabella V were a big increase, and followed by Maltese Falcon. In the 2010s, a host of similar and larger yachts came to fruition, including Sailing Yacht A, Aquijo, and Black Pearl.

While these vessels are large for sailing yachts, this size is more common among motor yachts. There are quite a number of large sailing vessels for other purposes, especially those for passenger cruises.

== Build history ==
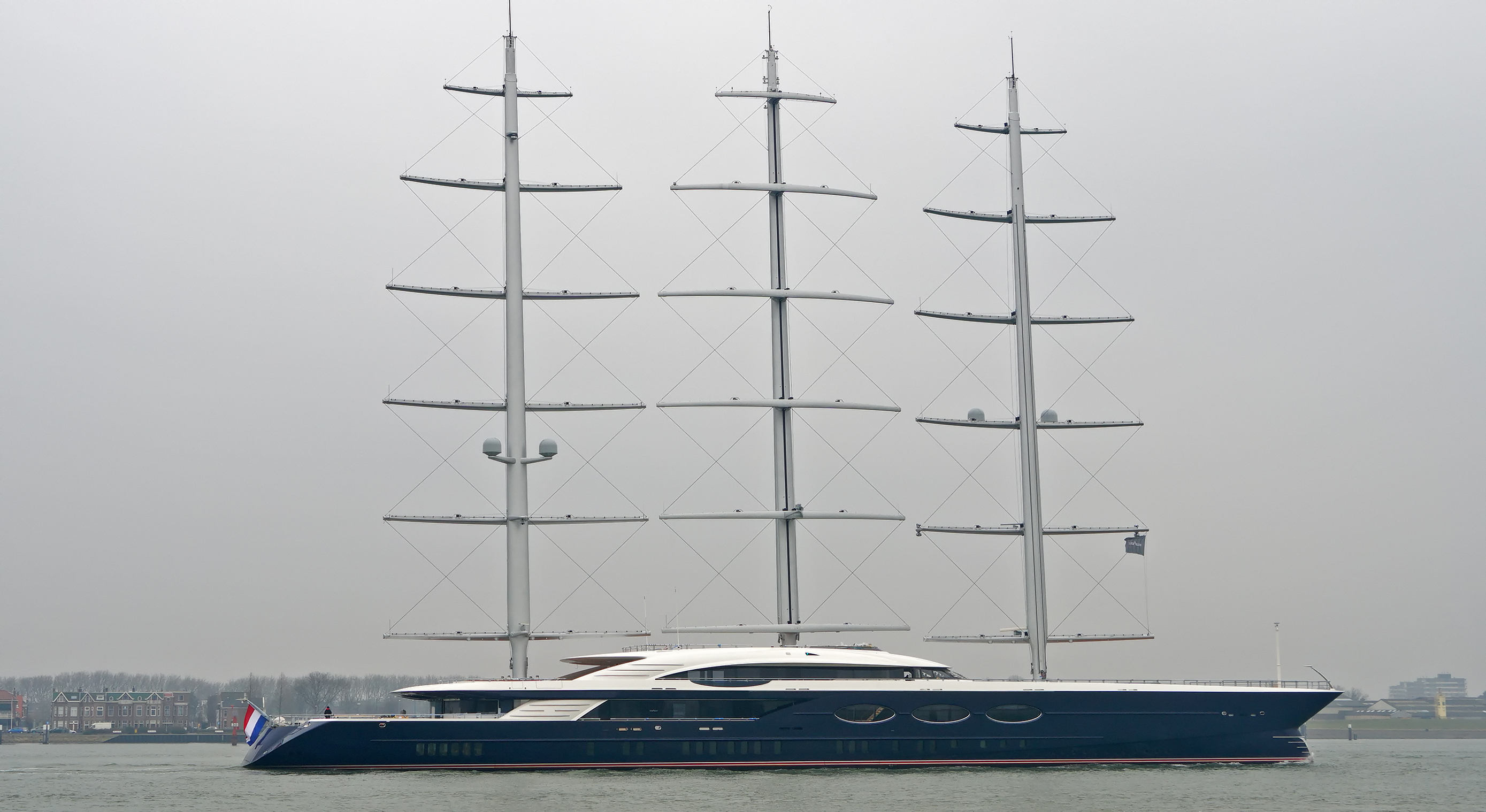
Sailing yacht Black Pearl (Oceanco Y712)

Inspired by the 88 m (289 ft) Maltese Falcon, the intention behind the project was to push the boundaries of the DynaRig system and demonstrate the potential for larger DynaRig-equipped vessels.

The creation of the yacht, then known as "Project Solar", began on 7 July 2010 when Ken Freivokh was contracted to handle styling and design on the project. Given their involvement with Maltese Falcon, Freivokh introduced Dykstra Naval Architects to the project, and the team were able to advance the DynaRig system and to improve performance through changes both to mast shape and installation. The 96 m (315 ft) preliminary concept that resulted was codenamed "Nautilus".

Freivokh then commissioned Devonport Yachts (Pendennis Shipyards) to undertake technical studies to complete the tendering package. The tendering process began in June 2011 and included seven shipyards worldwide.

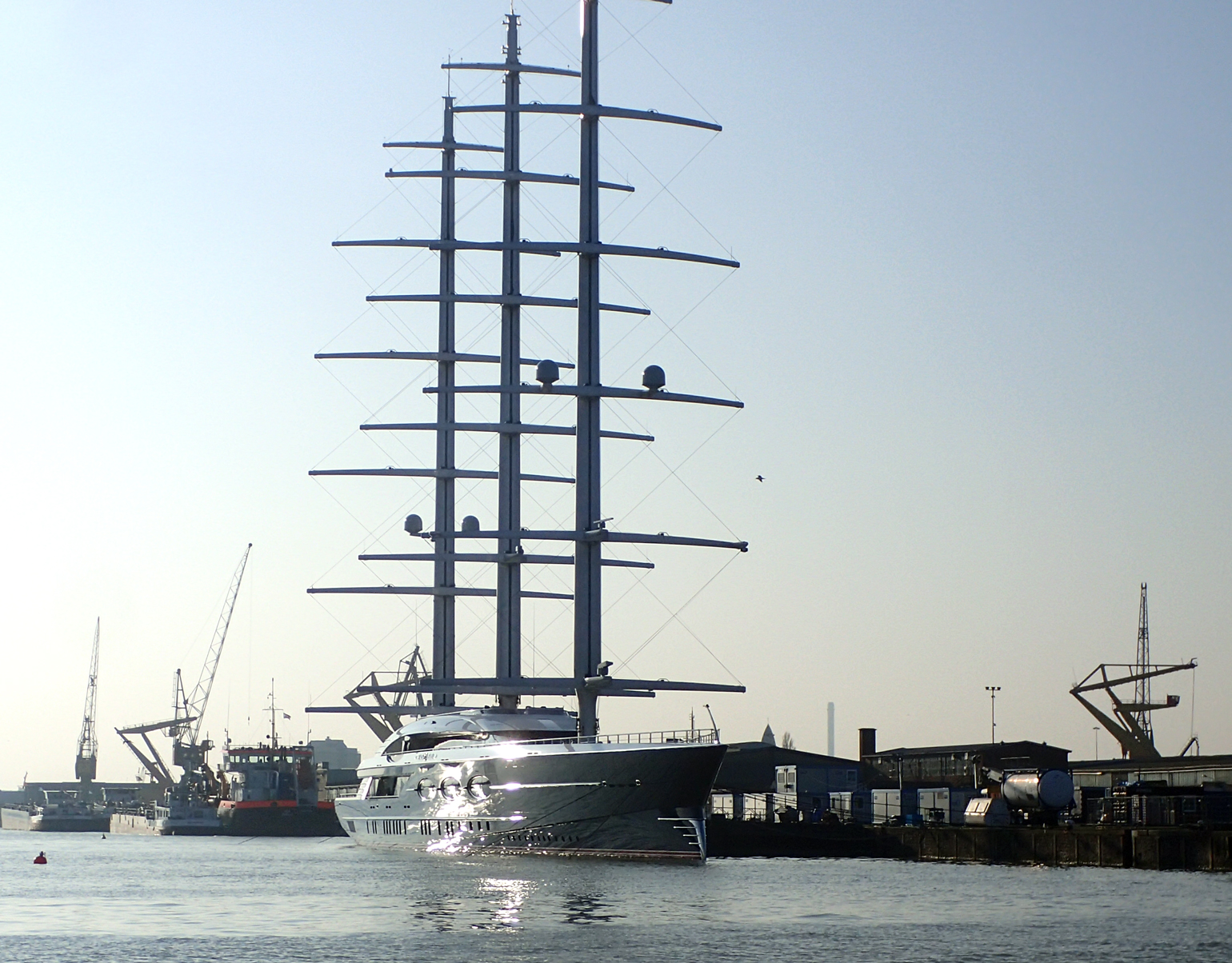
Black Pearl in Rotterdam

By November 2011, Freivokh had extended the design from 96 m to 100 m (328 ft) and a scale model was produced. Dutch builders Oceanco were selected from the tendering process to construct the yacht at their Rotterdam shipyard.

The design and details of the yacht developed continuously during the build process, with the owner having a direct input on many aspects of the final design. The final design had the yacht at 106.8 m, and the yacht, built under the name Y712, was then named Black Pearl.

The overall yacht design was done by Ken Freivokh, Gerard Villate, Nigel Gee, and Nuvolari Lenard, with others. The yacht was constructed at Oceanco in Alblasserdam, and launched in September 2016.

In early 2018, it was delivered to the customer after it had undergone sea trials.

== DynaRig System ==
The DynaRig owes its origin to Wilhelm Prölss' research in the 1960s. The DynaRig consists of freestanding rotating masts with rigid yards and acts as a square rig. Each of Black Pearl's masts supports six yards, which, unlike a conventional square rigger, have built-in camber of 12%. The fifteen square sails are set between the yards in such a way that when deployed there are no gaps in the sail plan of each mast, enabling them to act as a single airfoil. The furling sails are stored in the mast and can be deployed along tracks on the yards in six minutes. The sails are trimmed by rotating the masts. As there is no rigging, the masts and yards can be rotated without restriction for all points of sail, making Black Pearl a capable upwind clipper.

== Summary ==
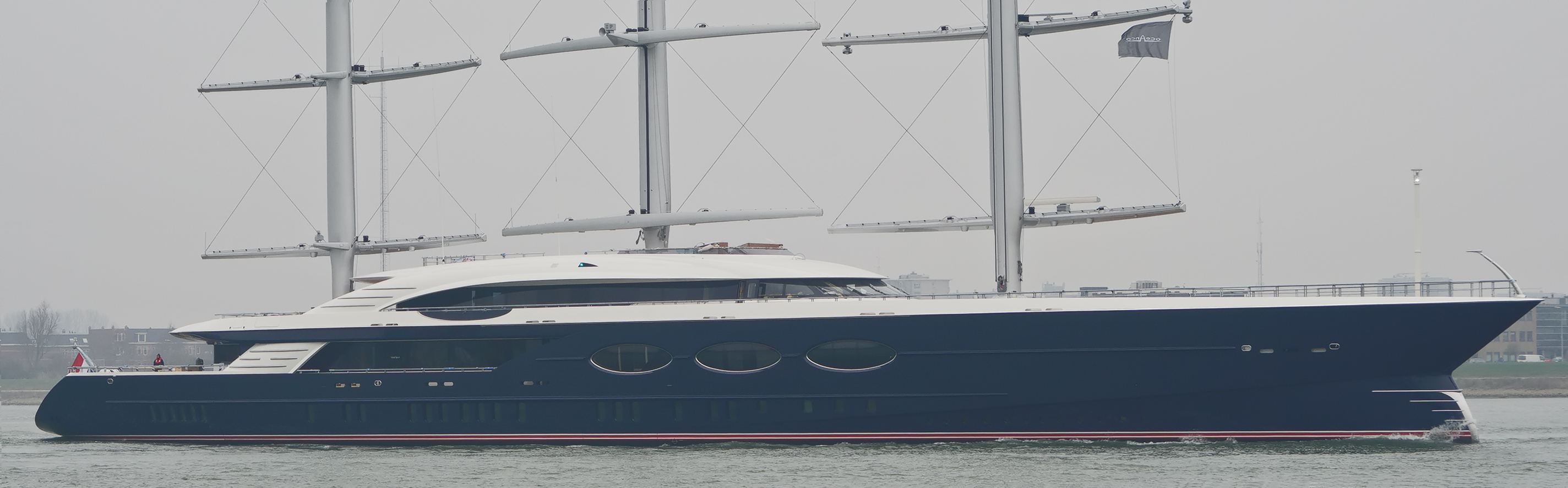

Black Pearl is a sailing yacht with three 70-meter (230 ft) high masts and is capable of 30 knots (56 km/h) in suitable weather conditions. It also has diesel engines that can propel it to 17.5 knots (32 km/h). She is capable of accommodating up to 12 guests in one master suite, two VIP and two double guests cabins.

As a private yacht, Black Pearl has various features, including an on-deck Jacuzzi, convertible cinema, full beam beach club, and a tender garage. Total interior volume is 2,700 gross tons. She won the Sailing Superyacht of the Year Award in 2019.

Specifications:

- Length - 106.7 meters (350 feet)
- Gross tonnage - 2,700 t (measure of interior volume)
- Guest capacity - 12 people (6 cabins)
- Sail Area - 2,900 square metres
- Max sail speed - 30 knots (56 km/h, 35 mph)

Timeline:

- Contract - 2010
- Purchased - 2012
- Launched - 2016
- Delivered - 2018
- Registered in the Cayman Islands

== Fuelless transatlantic voyager capability ==
Black Pearl is designed to generate electricity to power its on-board systems by using its propeller as a turbine as the yacht is propelled by the wind.

Under sea trials, Black Pearl achieved 20 knots of speed on the water, and its developers expected as of 2018 that it might one day be able to transit the Atlantic using no fuel. In its first crossing, 5,600 nm from Montenegro to St. Barths in 2023, Black Pearl sailed approximately 80% of the distance and consumed 32,000 liters of fuel. A traditional similar-sized yacht would have consumed 200,000 liters for the same passage.

== See also ==
- List of yachts built by Oceanco
- List of large sailing yachts
