= DynaRig =

Modern form of sailing ship rigging

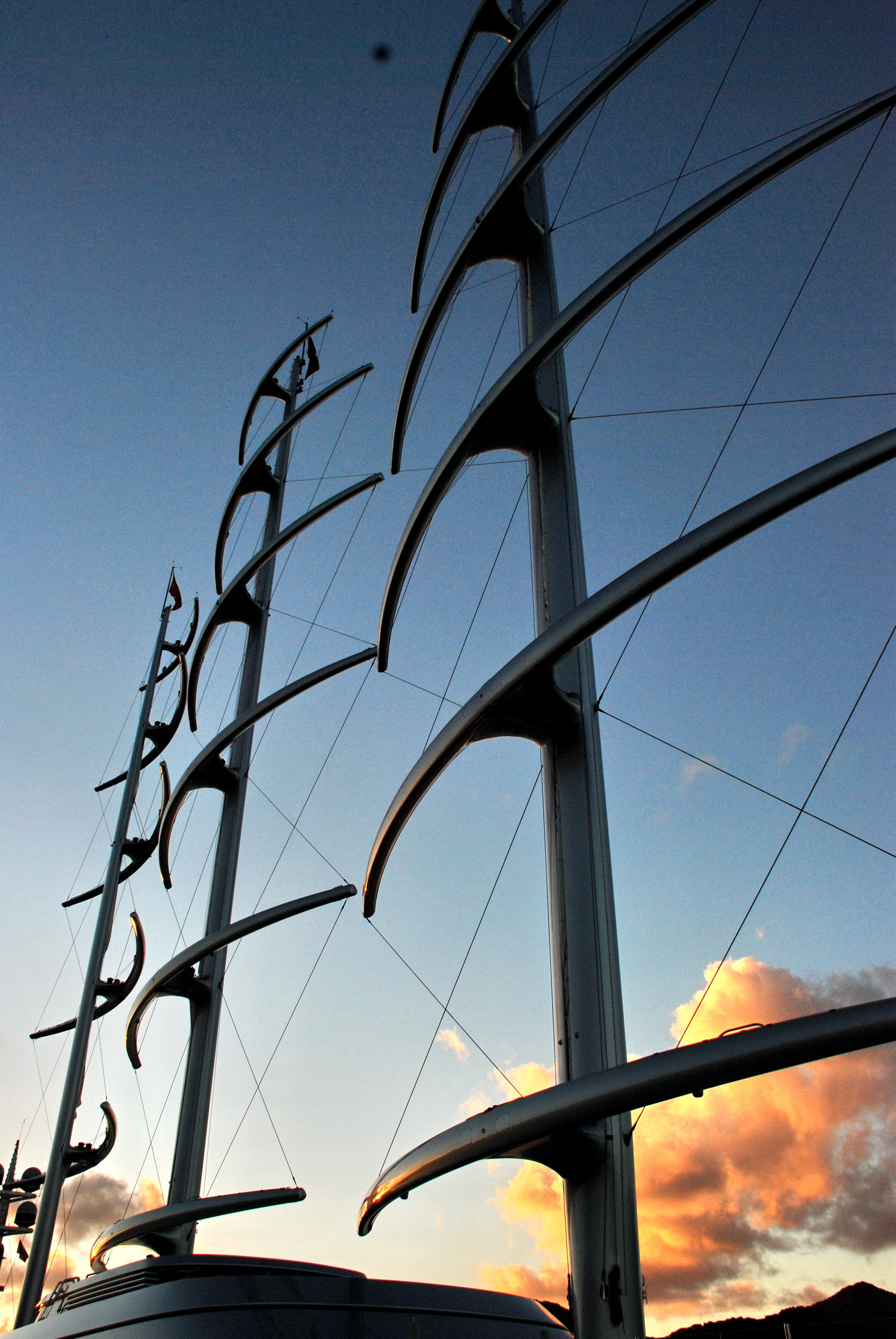
Maltese Falcon masts

The DynaRig is a conceptualization of a square-rigged form of rigging, designed in the 1960s by the German engineer Wilhelm Prölß. While having the appearance of the rigging of a 19th-century clipper ship, it was not actually implemented on a sailing vessel until several decades after its design because of a lack of adequate construction materials. It was fitted to one of the world's largest yachts, the Maltese Falcon. When the original patent rights and residual technology were purchased from the German government by an American investor in 2001, it was renamed the Falcon rig. The DynaRig is now being designed and manufactured by Southern Spars.

The DynaRig, along with the original, "DynaSchiff", is a trademarked name. The original concept by Prölß was for a combined rig and hull with extremely high efficiency of operation and the use of wind power to propel a large vessel across an open body of water. The modern controller for the entire ship's rig consists of a single panel operated by a single person. The masts are freestanding, the curved yards being attached rigidly to the masts. To adjust the angle of the sails, the entire mast rotates in place. When fully deployed, the sails on each mast have no gaps between them, creating a single panel to capture the wind. It is estimated to have twice the efficiency of a traditional square rig.

The design for the rig of Maltese Falcon was formalised and tested by Dutch naval architects Dykstra Naval Architects, and engineered and built by Insensys Ltd. on the premises of Perini Navi in Istanbul.

In 2016 a similar rig designed and engineered by the same team was built by Magma Structures in Portsmouth and fitted to the 106 m vessel Black Pearl built by Dutch shipyard Oceanco in Alblasserdam and designed by Italian Nuvolari Lenard. Naval architecture and DynaRig design of Black Pearl was done by Dykstra Naval Architects.
