= List of effects =

This is a list of names for observable phenomena that contain the word “effect”, amplified by reference(s) to their respective fields of study.

== A ==
- Abscopal effect (cancer treatments) (immune system) (medical treatments) (radiation therapy)
- Accelerator effect (economics)
- Accordion effect (physics) (waves)
- Acousto-optic effect (nonlinear optics) (waves)
- Additive genetic effects (genetics)
- Aharonov–Bohm effect (quantum mechanics)
- Al Jazeera effect (Al Jazeera) (media issues)
- Alienation effect (acting techniques) (Bertolt Brecht theories and techniques) (film theory) (metafictional techniques) (theatre)
- Allais effect (fringe physics)
- Allee effect (biology)
- Ambiguity effect (cognitive biases)
- Anrep effect (cardiology) (medicine)
- Antenna effect (digital electronics) (electronic design automation)
- Anti-greenhouse effect (atmospheric dynamics) (atmospheric science) (astronomy) (planetary atmospheres)
- Askaryan effect (particle physics)
- Asymmetric blade effect (aerodynamics)
- Audience effect (psychology) (social psychology)
- Auger effect (atomic physics) (foundational quantum physics)
- Aureole effect (atmospheric optical phenomena) (scientific terminology)
- Autler–Townes effect (atomic, molecular, and optical physics) (atomic physics) (quantum optics)
- Autokinetic effect (vision)
- Avalanche effect (cryptography)
- Averch–Johnson effect (economics)

== B ==
- Baader-Meinhof effect / Baader-Meinhof phenomenon (psychology)
- Balassa–Samuelson effect (economics)
- Baldwin effect (evolutionary biology) (selection)
- Balloon-carried light effect (balloons) (culture) (entertainment)
- Bambi effect (hunting) (psychology stubs)
- Bandwagon effect (cognitive biases) (crowd psychology) (economics effects) (metaphors) (propaganda techniques)
- Bank effect (marine propulsion) (nautical terms) (water)
- Barkhausen effect (condensed matter) (magnetism)
- Barnett effect (condensed matter) (magnetism)
- Barnum effect (psychology)
- Baskerville effect (cardiology)
- Bauschinger effect (classical mechanics) (materials science)
- Beaujolais effect (Ada programming language)
- Ben Franklin effect (emotion) (psychology)
- Bernoulli effect (equations) (fluid dynamics) (wind power)
- Beta-silicon effect (physical organic chemistry)
- Bezold effect (optical illusions) (psychological theories)
- Bezold–Brücke effect (optical illusions)
- Biefeld–Brown effect (physical phenomena) (propulsion)
- Big-fish–little-pond effect (educational psychology) (pedagogy)
- Birthday-number effect (psychology)
- Black drop effect (astronomical transits)
- Blazhko effect (astronomy)
- Blocking effect (psychology)
- Bloom (shader effect) (3D computer graphics) (demo effects)
- Bohr effect (hematology) (hemoproteins) (respiratory physiology)
- Boomerang effect (psychology) (social psychology) (psychology)
- Bouba/kiki effect (cognitive science)
- Bowditch effect (medicine)
- Bradley effect (American political terms) (elections in the United States) (political history of the United States) (political neologisms) (politics and race) (polling) (psephology) (racism)
- Bridgman effect (electricity) (electromagnetism)
- Brookings effect (atmospheric science) (Curry County, Oregon) (Oregon coast) (Oregon geography) (winds)
- Brown Willy effect (geography of Cornwall) (mesoscale meteorology)
- Bruce effect (reproduction)
- Bullwhip effect (distribution, retailing, and wholesaling)
- Butterfly effect (chaos theory) (physical phenomena) (stability theory)
- Bystander effect (crowd psychology) (social phenomena)
- Bystander effect (radiobiology) (radiobiology)

== C ==
- Cage effect (chemistry)
- Calendar effect (behavioral finance) (market trends)
- Callendar effect (atmospheric science) (climate) (climate change)
- Captodative effect (organic chemistry)
- Capture effect (broadcast engineering) (radio) (radio communications/) (telecommunications) (wireless communications)
- Carnoustie effect (golf) (golf terminology)
- Carryover effect (cooking techniques) (food and drink)
- Cascade effect (ecology)
- Cascade effect (spaceflight)
- Casimir effect (quantum field theory) (physical phenomena)
- Castle thunder (sound effect) (in-jokes) (sound effects)
- Catapult effect (electromagnetism)
- Catch-up effect (economics effects)
- Catfish effect (human resource management) (management) (organizational studies and human resource management) (social psychology)
- Cause and effect
- Ceiling effect (medical treatment) (statistics)
- Channel capture effect (ethernet) (network topology)
- Cheerio effect (fluid mechanics) (physics)
- Cherenkov effect (experimental particle physics) (fundamental physics concepts) (particle physics) (special relativity)
- Chilling effect (law) (censorship) (freedom of expression) (American legal terms)
- Chimney effect
- Chorus effect (audio effects) (audio engineering) (effects units) (sound recording)
- Christiansen effect (optical filters)
- Christofilos effect (particle physics)
- Cinderella effect (child abuse)
- Cis effect (inorganic chemistry)
- Clientele effect (economics) (finance)
- Cluster effect (economics effects)
- CNN effect (civil–military relations) (CNN) (news media) (warfare of the modern era)
- Coandă effect (aerodynamics) (boundary layers) (physical phenomena)
- Coattail effect (political terms)
- Cobra effect (Economics)
- Cocktail party effect (acoustical signal processing) (attention)
- Cohort effect
- Common-ion effect (ions) (physical chemistry)
- Compton effect (astrophysics) (atomic physics) (foundational quantum physics) (observational astronomy) (quantum electrodynamics) (X-rays)
- Contrast effect (cognition) (cognitive biases) (perception) (vision)
- Coolidge effect (jokes) (sexual attraction)
- Coriolis effect (atmospheric dynamics) (classical mechanics) (force) (physical phenomena) (urban legends)
- Cotton effect (atomic, molecular, and optical physics) (polarization)
- Cotton–Mouton effect (magnetism) (optics)
- Crabtree effect (biochemistry)
- Cross-race effect (face recognition)
- CSI effect (criminal law) (criminology) (CSI television series) (psychology) (television terminology)
- Cupertino effect (computers) (spell checking)
- Cytopathic effect (microbiology terms)

== D ==
- Déjà vu effect
- De Haas–van Alphen effect (condensed matter) (magnetism) (quantum physics)
- (de Sitter effect: see) Geodetic effect (general relativity)
- Debye–Falkenhagen effect
- Decoy effect (consumer behavior) (decision theory) (economic theories) (finance theory) (marketing)
- Delay (audio effect) (audio effects) (effects units) (musical techniques)
- Dellinger effect (radio communications)
- Dember effect (electrical phenomena) (physics)
- Demo effect (demoscene)
- Demonstration effect (human behavior) (sociological terms)
- Denomination effect (behavioral economics)
- Diderot effect (anthropology) (consumer behaviour)
- Ding Hai effect (economy of Hong Kong) (Hong Kong culture)
- Direct effect (European Union law)
- Disposal tax effect (economics and finance) (finance) (taxation)
- Disposition effect (economics and finance)
- Dole effect (climatology) (oxygen) (paleoclimatology) (photosynthesis)
- Domino effect (physics) (politics)
- Doppler effect (Doppler effects) (radio frequency propagation) (wave mechanics)
- Downing effect (psychology)
- Dresselhaus effect (physics)
- Droste effect (artistic techniques)
- Dunning–Kruger effect (personality) (social psychology)

== E ==
- Eagle effect (antibiotic resistance) (pharmacology)
- Early effect (transistors)
- Eberhard effect (science of photography)
- Edge effect (ecological succession) (ecology)
- Edison effect (atomic physics) (electricity) (Thomas Edison) (vacuum tubes)
- Efimov effect (physics)
- Einstein effect (disambiguation), several different effects in physics
- Einstein–de Haas effect (science)
- Electro-optic effect (nonlinear optics)
- Electrocaloric effect (cooling technology) (heat pumps)
- Electron-cloud effect (particle accelerators) (physics)
- Electroviscous effects (colloid chemistry) (surface chemistry)
- ELIZA effect (artificial intelligence) (human–computer interaction) (propositional fallacies)
- Embedding effect (environmental economics)
- EMC effect (particle physics)
- Emerson effect (photosynthesis)
- Endowment effect (behavioral finance) (cognitive biases) (psychological theories)
- Enhanced Permeability and Retention effect (medicine)
- Eötvös effect (geodesy) (topography)
- Epps effect (econometrics) (statistical terminology) (statistics)
- Ettinghausen effect (condensed matter) (electrodynamics) (thermodynamics)
- Evershed effect (physics) (solar phenomena)
- Exciter (effect) (audio effects) (effects units)

== F ==
- Fahraeus–Lindquist effect (blood) (fluid dynamics) (molecular and cellular biology)
- False consensus effect (cognitive biases) (futurology) (group processes) (psychological theories) (sustainability)
- Faraday effect (magnetism) (optics)
- Ferroelectric effect (condensed matter physics) (electrical phenomena)
- Fink effect (anesthesia) (diffusion)
- Floating body effect (electronics) (semiconductors)
- Floodgate effect (social phenomena) (sociology)
- Floor effect (statistics)
- Florence Nightingale effect (Florence Nightingale) (love) (psychology)
- Flutie effect (student sport)
- Flux pinning (Physics)
- Flynn effect (futurology) (intelligence) (psychological theories) (psychometrics) (race and intelligence controversy)
- Focusing effect (cognitive biases)
- Forbush effect (cosmic rays) (solar phenomena)
- Forer effect (cognitive biases) (history of astrology) (psychological theories)
- Founder effect (ecology) (population genetics)
- Fractional quantum Hall effect (physics)
- Franssen effect (acoustics) (sound perception)
- Franz–Keldysh effect (condensed matter) (electronic engineering) (electronics) (optics) (optoelectronics)
- Free surface effect (fluid mechanics)
- Front projection effect (film production)
- Fujiwhara effect (tropical cyclone meteorology) (vortices)
- Full screen effect (computer graphics) (demo effects)

== G ==
- Garshelis effect (electric and magnetic fields in matter) (magnetism) (physics)
- Gauche effect (stereochemistry)
- Gell-Mann amnesia effect (journalism)
- Generation effect (cognitive biases) (memory biases) (psychological theories)
- Geodetic effect (general relativity)
- Gerschenkron effect (economic development) (economic systems) (economics and finance) (econometrics) (index numbers) (national accounts)r
- Giant magnetoresistive effect (condensed matter physics) (electric and magnetic fields in matter) (quantum electronics) (spintronics)
- Gibbons–Hawking effect (general relativity)
- Gibbs–Donnan effect (biology) (physics)
- Gibbs–Thomson effect (petrology) (thermodynamics)
- Glass house effect (culture) (surveillance)
- Glasser effect (physics)
- Goos–Hänchen effect (optical phenomena)
- Great Salt Lake effect (natural history of Utah)
- Green-beard effect (evolution) (evolutionary biology) (game theory) (selection)
- Greenhouse effect (atmosphere) (atmospheric radiation) (climate change feedbacks and causes) (climate forcing)
- Ground effect (aircraft) (aerodynamics)
- Ground effect (cars) (aerodynamics) (motorsport terminology)
- Gunn effect (diodes) (microwave technology) (physics) (terahertz technology)

== H ==
- Haas effect (audio engineering) (sound) (speakers)
- Haldane effect (hematology) (hemoproteins) (protein)
- Hall effect (condensed matter physics) (electric and magnetic fields in matter)
- Hall of mirrors effect (computer graphic artifacts) (Doom) (id software) (video game glitches)
- Halo effect (cognitive biases) (educational psychology) (logical fallacies) (social psychology)
- Hanbury Brown and Twiss effect (quantum optics)
- Harem effect (harem) (human sexuality) (sex) (sexual orientation and identity) (sexual orientation and society)
- Hawthorne effect (educational psychology) (psychological theories) (social phenomena)
- Health effect (health) (health effectors) (pollution)
- Holtzman effect (Dune technology) (physics in fiction)
- Horizon effect (artificial intelligence) (game artificial intelligence)
- Hostile media effect (cognitive biases) (criticism of journalism) (journalism standards) (psychological theories)
- Hot chocolate effect (acoustics) (physics) (wave mechanics)
- Hundredth monkey effect (behavioral science) (New Age) (urban legends)
- Hydrophobic effect (chemical bonding) (supramolecular chemistry)
- Hyperchromic effect (biochemistry)
- Hypersonic effect (acoustics) (hearing) (psychology) (ultrasound)

== I ==
- Ideomotor effect
- IKEA effect (marketing) (psychology)
- Imbert–Fedorov effect (optical phenomena)
- In-camera effect (filming) (special effects)
- Incidental effect (European Union law)
- Indirect effect (European Union law)
- Inductive effect (chemical bonding)
- Inert-pair effect (atomic physics) (inorganic chemistry) (quantum chemistry)
- inertial supercharging effect (automobile) (engine technology)
- Inner-platform effect (anti-patterns)
- International Fisher effect (economics and finance) (finance theories) (interest rates)
- Inverse Doppler effect (Doppler effects) (wave mechanics)
- Inverse Faraday effect (electric and magnetic fields in matter) (optical phenomena)

== J ==
- Jack-in-the-box effect (military) (military slang and jargon) (tanks)
- Jahn–Teller effect (condensed matter physics) (inorganic chemistry) (organometallic chemistry) (quantum chemistry)
- January effect (behavioral finance) (economics and finance) (market trends) (stock market)
- Janus effect (effects) (sociology)
- Johnsen–Rahbek effect (classical mechanics) (electrical engineering)
- Joule–Thomson effect (thermodynamics)
- Josephson effect (condensed matter physics) (sensors) (superconductivity)
- Jupiter effect (astronomy) (science book)

== K ==
- Kadenacy effect (automobile parts) (engine technology)
- Kapitsa–Dirac effect (physics)
- Kappa effect (geography) (psychology)
- Karr Creates effect (JolliBini) (Jollibee x Karr Creates)
- Kate Middleton effect (celebrity) (fashion)
- Kautsky effect (fluorescence)
- Kaye effect (fluid dynamics)
- Ken Burns effect (film techniques)
- Kendall effect (telecommunications)
- Kerr effect (nonlinear optics)
- Keynes effect (economics and finance) (Keynesian economics)
- Keystone effect (technology)
- Kinetic depth effect (perception)
- Kinetic isotope effect (chemical kinetics) (physical organic chemistry)
- Kirkendall effect (chemistry) (metallurgy)
- Klein–Nishina effect (quantum field theory)
- Knife-edge effect (radio frequency propagation)
- Kohn effect (physics)
- Kondo effect (condensed matter physics) (physical phenomena)
- Kozai effect (astronomy) (celestial mechanics)
- Kuleshov effect (cinema of Russia) (cognitive biases) (film editing) (film techniques) (psychological theories)

== L ==
- Lake effect (snow or ice weather phenomena)
- Lake Wobegon effect (cognitive biases) (psychological theories) (social psychology)
- Landau–Pomeranchuk–Migdal effect (high-energy physics)
- Larsen effect (audio feedback)
- Late effect (disease)
- Lawn dart effect (psychology)
- Lazarus effect (particle detectors)
- Lead–lag effect (control theory) (economics and finance)
- Leakage effect (tourism)
- Learning effect (economics) (economics) (economics terminology)
- Lee–Boot effect (biology) (reproduction)
- Legalized abortion and crime effect (abortion debate) (criminology)
- Leidenfrost effect (physical phenomena)
- Lenard effect (physics)
- Lense–Thirring effect (effects of gravitation) (tests of general relativity)
- Leveling effect (chemistry)
- Levels-of-processing effect (educational psychology) (psychology) (psychological theories)
- Liquid Sky (effect) (lasers) (stage lighting)
- Little–Parks effect (condensed matter physics)
- Lockin effect (physics)
- Lombard effect (phonetics) (human voice) (animal communication) (human communication) (noise pollution)
- Lotus effect (nanotechnology)
- Low-frequency effects (film sound production) (technology)
- Lubberts effect (medicine) (radiography) (radiology)
- Lunar effect (moon myths) (pseudoscience)
- Luxemburg–Gorky effect (radio communication) (radio spectrum)

== M ==
- Magali effect
- Magneto-optic effect (electric and magnetic fields in matter) (optical phenomena)
- Magneto-optic Kerr effect (condensed matter physics) (electric and magnetic fields in matter) (optical phenomena)
- magnetocaloric effect (physical phenomena) (electric and magnetic fields in matter) (thermodynamics)
- Magnus effect (fluid dynamics)
- Malmquist effect (astronomy)
- Malter effect (physics)
- Mandela effect (psychology) (paranormal)
- Mandelbaum effect (psychology) (visual phenomena)
- Marangoni effect (fluid dynamics) (fluid mechanics) (physical phenomena)
- Marchywka effect (electrochemistry) (ultraviolet sensor production)
- Mark Twain effect (economics and finance) (stock market)
- Martha Mitchell effect (psychological theories) (psychosis)
- Massenerhebung effect (trees)
- Maternal age effect (developmental biology)
- Maternal effect (developmental biology)
- Matthew effect (education) (education)
- Matilda effect (Research)
- Matthew effect (sociology) (adages) (social phenomena) (sociology of scientific knowledge)
- McClintock effect (menstruation)
- McCollough effect (optical illusions)
- McGurk effect (auditory illusions) (perception) (psychological theories)
- Meissner effect (levitation) (magnetism) (superconductivity)
- Meitner–Hupfeld effect (particle physics)
- Mellanby effect (health) (alcohol intoxication)
- Memory effect (electric batteries)
- Mesomeric effect (chemical bonding)
- Microwave auditory effect (cognitive neuroscience) (espionage) (hearing) (human psychology) (less-lethal weapons) (mind control) (sound)
- Mid-domain effect (macroecology) (biogeography) (biodiversity)
- Mikheyev–Smirnov–Wolfenstein effect (particle physics)
- Milky seas effect (aquatic biology) (biological oceanography) (bioluminescence)
- Miller effect (electrical engineering) (electronics terms)
- Miniature effect (film and video technology) (film techniques) (scale modeling) (scientific modeling) (special effects) (visual effects)
- Misinformation effect (cognitive biases) (psychological theories)
- Missing letter effect (perception) (psychometrics)
- Misnay–Schardin effect (explosives)
- Mohring effect (microeconomics) (transportation)
- Mössbauer effect (condensed matter physics) (nuclear physics) (physical phenomena)
- Mozart effect (education psychology) (popular psychology) (psychological theories) (Wolfgang Amadeus Mozart)
- Mpemba effect (phase changes) (physical paradoxes) (thermodynamics)
- Mullins effect (rubber properties)
- Multiple-effect humidification (drinking water) (water supply) (water treatment)
- Munroe effect (explosive weapons) (explosives)

== N ==
- Name-letter effect (psychology)
- Negative (positive) contrast effect (psychology)
- Negativity effect (cognitive biases) (psychological theories)
- Neglected firm effect (business analysis)
- Nernst effect (electrodynamics) (thermodynamics)
- Network effect (business models) (economics effects) (information technology) (monopoly [economics]) (networks) (transport economics)
- Non-thermal microwave effect (chemical kinetics)
- Nordtvedt effect (astronomy) (astrophysics) (effects of gravitation) (relativity) (theoretical physics)
- Novaya Zemlya effect (arctic) (atmospheric optical phenomena) (atmospheric science) (Novaya Zemlya) (solar phenomena)
- Novelty effect (learning) (psychology)
- Nuclear Overhauser effect (chemical physics) (nuclear magnetic resonance) (physical chemistry) (spectroscopy)
- Numerosity adaptation effect (cognitive science) (optical illusions) (perception)
- Nut Island effect (human resource management) (organizational studies and human resource management)

== O ==
- Oberth effect (physics)
- Observer effect (information technology) (computer programming)
- Observer effect (physics) (physics)
- Observer-expectancy effect (cognitive biases) (cognitive psychology)
- Occlusion effect (biology) (otology)
- Octave effect (effects units)
- Okorokov effect (physics)
- Oligodynamic effect (biology and pharmacology of chemical elements)
- Online disinhibition effect (Internet culture) (psychology)
- Onnes effect (condensed matter physics) (fluid mechanics) (helium)
- Opposition effect (astronomy) (optical phenomena) (observational astronomy) (radiometry) (scattering, absorption and radiative transfer [optics])
- Osborne effect (marketing)
- Ostrich effect (adages)
- Ouzo effect (Colloidal chemistry) (Chemical mixtures) (Condensed matter physics) (Soft matter) (Fluid dynamics)
- Overconfidence effect (cognitive biases) (psychological theories)
- Overjustification effect (educational psychology) (psychological theories) (psychology)
- Overview effect (spaceflight) (transcendence) (psychology)
- Ovsiankina effect (psychology)

== P ==
- Pandemonium effect (gamma spectroscopy)
- Partner effects (economics) (sociology)
- Paschen–Back effect (atomic physics) (atomic, molecular, and optical physics) (magnetism)
- Pasteur effect (beer and brewery) (biochemistry) (fermentation) (metabolism)
- Paternal effect – (developmental biology)
- Pauli effect (experimental physics) (parapsychology) (psychokinesis)
- Payne effect (rubber properties)
- Pearson–Anson effect (electronics)
- Peltier–Seebeck effect (thermoelectric effect) (electricity) (HVAC) (physical phenomena) (thermodynamics)
- Peltzman effect (economics of regulation) (University of Chicago)
- Penn effect (economics effects)
- Petkau effect (radiobiology)
- Phaser (effect) (audio effects) (effects units)
- Phillips effect (employment) (inflation)
- Photoacoustic Doppler effect (Doppler effects) (radar signal processing) (radio frequency propagation) (wave mechanics)
- Photoelectric effect (Albert Einstein) (electrical phenomena) (foundational quantum physics)
- Photorefractive effect (nonlinear optics)
- Photothermal effect (particle physics) (photochemistry) (physics)
- Picture superiority effect (cognitive biases) (educational psychology) (memory biases) (psychological theories)
- Piezoresistive effect (electrical phenomena)
- Pigou effect (economics effects)
- Pioneer effect (astrodynamics) (pioneer program)
- Placebo effect (bioethics) (clinical research) (experimental design) (history of medicine) (Latin medical phrases) (Latin words and phrases) (medical ethics) (medical terms) (medicinal chemistry) (mind–body interventions) (pharmacology) (psychological theories) (research methods) (theories)
- Plasma effect (demo effects)
- Plateau effect (systems science) (metaphors referring to places)
- Plummer effect (iodine) (medicine)
- Pockels effect (cryptography) (nonlinear optics) (polarization)
- Polar effect (physical organic chemistry)
- Polar effect (genetics) (genetics)
- Portevin–Le Chatelier effect (engineering) (materials science)
- Position-effect variegation (genetics)
- Positivity effect (aging) (cognition) (cognitive biases) (memory) (memory biases) (psychological theories) (psychology)
- Poynting effect (gases)
- Poynting–Robertson effect (celestial mechanics)
- Practical effect (special effects)
- Pratfall effect (psychology)
- Precedence effect (acoustics) (sound perception)
- Primakoff effect (particle physics)
- Priority effect (ecology)
- Probe effect (software development philosophies) (system administration)
- Proteus effect (consciousness) (psychology)
- Proximity effect (atomic physics) (nuclear physics) (physics)
- Proximity effect (audio) (acoustics)
- Proximity effect (electromagnetism) (electrical engineering)
- Proximity effect (electron beam lithography) (condensed matter physics)
- Proximity effect (superconductivity) (superconductivity)
- Pseudocertainty effect
- Pulfrich effect (3D imaging) (optical illusions)
- Purkinje effect (optical illusions) (perception) (vision)
- Pygmalion effect (cognitive biases)

== Q ==
- QMR effect (electric and magnetic fields in matter) (magnetism) (optics) (optical phenomena)
- Quantum-confined Stark effect (quantum mechanics)
- Quantum Hall effect (Hall effect) (condensed matter physics) (quantum electronics) (spintronics)
- Quantum Zeno effect (quantum measurement)

== R ==
- Raman effect (physics)
- Ramp effect (drug addiction) (drug rehabilitation)
- Ramsauer–Townsend effect (physical phenomena) (scattering)
- Ransom note effect (typography)
- Rashomon effect (psychology)
- Ratchet effect (game theory)
- Rear projection effect (special effects)
- Rebound effect (medical sign)
- Rebound effect (conservation) (economics paradoxes) (energy) (energy conservation)
- Red-eye effect (science of photography)
- Relativistic Doppler effect (Doppler effects) (special relativity)
- Renner–Teller effect (molecular physics)
- Reverse Cerenkov effect (physics)
- Reverse short-channel effect (transistors)
- Ringelmann effect (social psychology)
- Ripple effect (education) (sociology)
- Robin Hood effect (income distribution) (Robin Hood) (socioeconomics) (taxation)
- Roe effect (abortion debate) (abortion in the United States)
- Root effect (fish) (hemoproteins) (respiratory physiology)
- Rope trick effect (nuclear weapons)
- Rossiter–McLaughlin effect (Doppler effects) (extrasolar planets) (spectroscopy) (star systems)
- Rusty bolt effect (radio electronics)
- Russ Christ effect (PV rejection profile)

== S ==
- Sabattier effect (solarization) (photographic processes) (science of photography)
- Sachs–Wolfe effect (astronomy) (physical cosmology)
- Sagnac effect (optics) (relativity)
- Sailing Ship Effect (business) (economics)
- Samba effect (Brazil) (economy of Brazil) (history of Brazil)
- Sandbox effect (Internet technology) (search engine optimization)
- Scharnhorst effect (quantum field theory)
- Schottky effect (diodes)
- Schwinger effect (particle physics) (hypothetical processes) (quantum electrodynamics)
- Screen-door effect (display technology) (technology)
- Second gas effect (anesthesia)
- Second-system effect (software development)
- Seeliger effect (astronomy) (observational astronomy)
- Serial position effect (cognitive biases) (psychological theories) (psychologicy)
- Shaft effect (motorcycle)
- Shapiro effect (effects of gravitation)
- Shielding effect (atomic, molecular, and optical physics) (atomic physics) (chemistry) (quantum chemistry)
- Shower-curtain effect (fluid dynamics)
- Shubnikov–de Haas effect (science)
- Side effect (computer science) (computer programming)
- Side effect (disambiguation)
- Signor–Lipps effect (extinction) (fossils) (paleontology)
- Silk screen effect (technology)
- Silo effect (management) (systems theory)
- Simon effect (psychology)
- Simpson's paradox aka Yule–Simpson effect (probability) (statistics)
- Skin effect (electronics)
- Slashdot effect (denial-of-service attacks)(Internet terminology) (Slashdot)
- Sleeper effect (social psychology)
- Smith–Purcell effect (physics) (quantum optics)
- Snackwell effect (consumer behaviour) (psychology)
- Snob effect (consumer theory) (economics and finance)
- Snowball effect (language) (metaphors)
- Somogyi effect (diabetes)
- Sound effect (film techniques) (sound effects) (sound production) (special effects)
- Soap opera effect (film techniques) (television terminology) (filming) (film editing)
- Southwest effect, The (airline terminology) (Southwest Airlines)
- Spacing effect (cognitive biases) (educational psychology) (psychological theories)
- Special effect (animation) (special effects)
- Spin Hall effect (condensed matter physics) (Hall effect) (physics) (spintronics)
- Spoiler effect (psephology) (voting theory)
- Stack effect (filming) (television terminology) (digital electronics) (film techniques)
- Stark effect (atomic physics) (foundational quantum physics) (physical phenomena)
- Stars (shader effect) (3D computer graphics) (computer graphics) (demo effects)
- Status effect (video game gameplay)
- Stewart–Tolman effect (electrodynamics)
- Stock sound effect (film and video technology) (film and video terminology) (film terminology)
- Storage effect (demography) (population ecology)
- Streisand effect (dynamic lists) (eponyms) (slang)
- Stroop effect (perception) (psychological tests)
- Steric effect (chemical kinetics) (chemical reactions) (collision theory) (molecular geometry) (stereochemistry)
- Subadditivity effect (cognitive biases)
- Subject-expectancy effect (cognitive biases)
- Sunyaev–Zel'dovich effect (physical cosmology) (radio astronomy)
- SVG filter effect (computer graphics) (computer graphics techniques) (image processing) (Scalable Vector Graphics)
- Szilard–Chalmers effect (nuclear chemistry)

== T ==
- Tamagotchi effect (psychology)
- Tanada effect (botany)
- Tanzi effect (taxation)
- Telescoping effect (memory biases) (psychology)
- Testing effect (educational psychology) (memory)
- Tetris effect (memory) (Tetris)
- Thatcher effect (vision)
- Therapeutic effect (medical treatment) (pharmacology)
- Thermal flywheel effect (heat) (thermodynamics)
- Thermal Hall effect (condensed matter) (Hall effect) (superconductivity)
- Third-person effect (media studies)
- Thorpe–Ingold effect (chemical kinetics) (organic chemistry)
- Threshold effect (particle physics) (physics) (renormalization group)
- Tinkerbell effect (sociology)
- Tocqueville effect (sociology)
- Training effect (cardiovascular system) (exercise physiology) (medicine) (respiratory system) (sports terminology)
- Trans effect (coordination chemistry)
- Transformer effect (electrodynamics)
- Transverse flow effect (aerodynamics)
- Trench effect (fire)
- Triboelectric effect (electrical phenomena) (electricity)
- Trickle-down economics
- Trickle-down fashion
- Trickle-up economics
- Trickle-up fashion
- Troxler effect (optical illusion)
- Twisted nematic field effect (display technology) (liquid crystal displays) (liquid crystals)
- Twomey effect (air pollution) (atmospheric radiation) (clouds, fog and precipitation)
- Tyndall effect (physical phenomena) (scattering)

== U ==
- Umov effect (astronomy) (observational astronomy) (planetary science)
- Unruh effect (quantum field theory) (thermodynamics)
- Urban heat island effect (climate change feedbacks and causes) (climate forcing)

== V ==
- Vandenbergh effect (biology)
- Vaporific effect (fire)
- Veblen effect (consumer theory) (goods)
- Venturi effect (fluid dynamics)
- Venus effect (artistic techniques) (cognitive science) (film techniques) (mirrors) (psychology)
- Visual effects (computer generated imagery)
- Visual effects art director
- Voigt effect (magnetism) (optics)
- Von Restorff effect (cognitive biases) (psychological theories)
- Vroman effect (molecular and cellular biology)

== W ==
- Wagon-wheel effect (optical illusion)
- Wahlund effect (evolution) (population genetics)
- Walker effect (illusions of self-motion) (spatial misconception)
- Walkman effect (computing and society) (technology)
- Wallace effect (evolutionary biology) (speciation)
- Warburg effect (biochemistry) (oncology) (photosynthesis)
- Wealth effect (economics and finance) (wealth)
- Weapons effect (gun politics)
- Weathervane effect (aviation terminology)
- Weissenberg effect (physics)
- Westermarck effect (psychology) (incest)
- Wet floor effect (computer graphic techniques) (computer graphics) (Web 2.0)
- Whitten effect (menstruation)
- Wien effect (electrochemistry)
- Wigner effect (condensed matter physics) (nuclear technology) (physical phenomena) (radiation effects)
- Wilson effect (astronomy) (Sun)
- Wilson–Bappu effect (physics)
- Wimbledon effect (economic theories) (economy of Japan) (economy of London)
- Windkessel effect (physiology)
- Withgott effect (linguistics) (phonetics)
- Wolf effect (scattering) (spectroscopy)
- Wolff–Chaikoff effect (iodine) (medicine)
- Woozle effect (psychology) (scientific method) (sociology)
- Word superiority effect (cognitive science)
- Worse-than-average effect (cognitive biases) (psychological theories) (social psychology)

== X ==
- Xenia effect (agriculture) (genetics)

== Y ==
- Yarkovsky effect (celestial mechanics)
- Yarkovsky–O'Keefe–Radzievskii–Paddack effect (celestial mechanics)
- Yule–Simpson effect (probability) (statistics)

== Z ==
- Zeeman effect (atomic physics) (foundational quantum physics) (magnetism) (physical phenomena)
- Zeigarnik effect (cognitive biases) (educational psychology) (learning) (psychological theories)
