= Physical effect =

Physical effect may refer to:

- Physical effect or phenomenon, any thing which manifests itself
- Physical effect, a consequence of causality (physics)
- Physical effect, a therapeutic effect or adverse effect of medical treatment on the body
- Physical effect or practical effect, a special effect achieved during filming rather than in post-production

== See also ==
- List of effects
