= Disposal =

Disposal may refer to:

- Bomb disposal, the process by which hazardous explosive devices are rendered safe
- Dispose pattern in computer programming
- Disposal of human corpses, the practice and process of dealing with the remains of a deceased human being
- Disposal tax effect, a concept in economics
- Garbage disposal, a device installed under a kitchen sink between the sink's drain and the trap which shreds food waste into pieces small enough to pass through plumbing
- Ship disposal, the disposing of a ship after it has reached the end of its effective or economic service life with an organisation
- Waste disposal, the getting rid of waste materials
- Disposal, a statistic in Australian rules football referring to kicks or handballs.
- Free disposal, the possibility of discarding resources without economic costs.

== See also ==
- Disposition (disambiguation)
- Disposable
