= Polisport =

Polisport Group
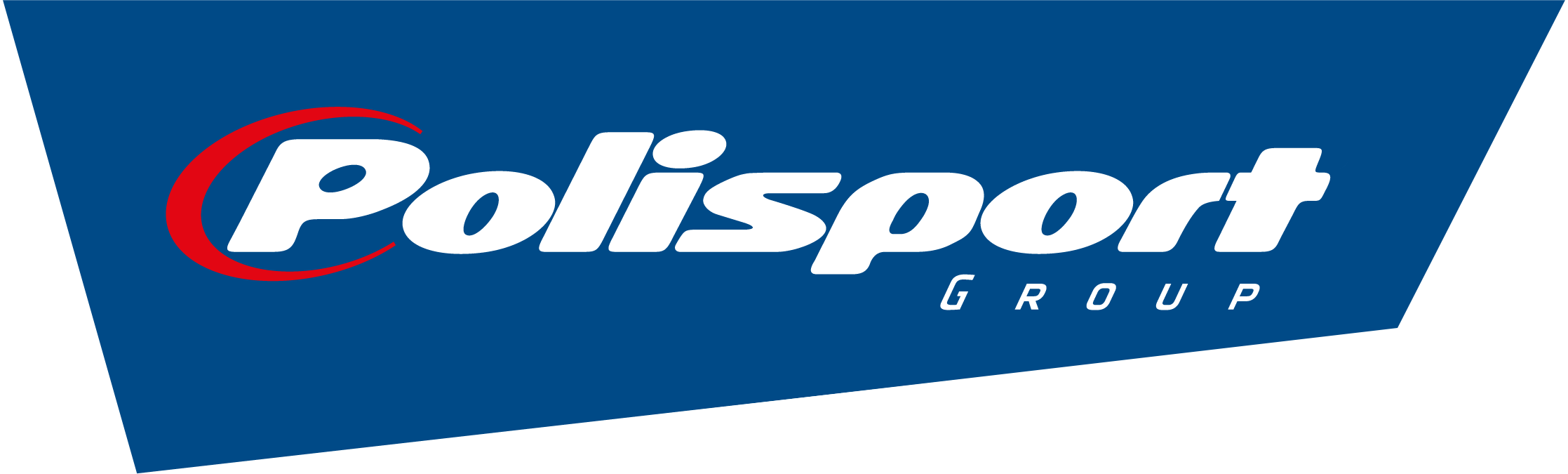
- Industry: Motorcycle/bicycle accessories manufacturing
- Founded: 1978
- Founder: Pedro Araújo
- Headquarters: Portugal
- Website: www.polisport.com

Polisport Group is a Portuguese brand known for its development and manufacturing of motorcycle accessories and bicycle accessories.

== History ==
Polisport, headquartered in Portugal, was established in 1978 by Pedro Araújo.

The Polisport Group is made up of five international companies namely; Polisport Plásticos S.A., Polinter Plásticos S.A., Polisport Molds LDA, Headgy Helmets, and Polistar LTDA.

In late 2013, Polisport Group acquired the brand Bobike – Bicycle Safety Seats, a Dutch company and former competitor.

== Products and services ==
Polisport manufactures and distributes motorcycle and bicycle accessories including child bicycle seats, helmets, handguards, headlights, body protectors, dirtbike body plastics and other related accessories. The Group sells majority of its output to foreign markets as well as being a key supplier for many OEM (original equipment manufacture) brands such as KTM, BMW, Suzuki, Decathlon, Husqvarna and Gas Gas.

== Awards and recognitions ==
- 2011 – Won two IF Design Awards: Product Design for Guppy bicycle baby seat and Material Design for Corky bicycle water bottle

== See also ==
- Motorcycle components
- Motorcycle personal protective equipment
