= Pembrokeshire Dangler =

Meteorological phenomenon over the Irish Sea

The Pembrokeshire Dangler is a convergence zone which forms a line of continuous showers aligned north-south across the Irish Sea; often as snow occurring during late autumn and winter, since the environmental factors required for its formation such as warm sea temperatures and cold Arctic air aloft are usually only met at this time of year.

It is initiated as a northerly flow is forced between the Rhins of Galloway and the Antrim Plateau. This is then augmented by land breeze effects producing winds blowing from east of north off England and Wales and from west of north off Ireland; these winds then converge down the length of the Irish Sea. As the convergence line spawns deep convection cells, they flow over progressively warmer waters creating further instability and prime conditions for prolonged convection across Pembrokeshire, Cornwall and west Devon.

On 25 November 2005 the Pembrokeshire Dangler gave 20 centimetres (7.9 in) of snow across Bodmin Moor and across parts of northwest Devon, particularly around Barnstaple, causing considerable disruption. Exactly five years later on 25 November 2010 another Pembrokeshire Dangler event caused 3–4 centimetres (1.2–1.6 in) of snow in the Bodmin area.

On 19 November 2025 a Pembrokeshire Dangler gave up to 25 centimetres (9.8 in) of snow on the north-facing slopes of the Preseli Hills.

== See also ==
- Brown Willy effect
- Puget Sound Convergence Zone
