= Ghe =

Ghe or GHE may refer to:

== Language ==
- Ge (Cyrillic), a letter of the Cyrillic script
- Ghe with upturn, a letter of the Cyrillic script, called Ghe in Ukrainian
- Southern Ghale language, spoken in Nepal (ISO 639-3 code: ghe)

== Other uses ==
- Garachiné Airport, in Panama (IATA code: GHE)
- Gernrode-Harzgerode Railway Company, a defunct German railway company
- Glass house effect, a psychological reaction to being observed extensively
- Greenhouse effect, a process contributing to global warming
- Ground heat exchanger, an element in a ground source heat pump
- GitHub, GitHub Enterprise
- Gemini Home Entertainment, a horror anthology web series released on YouTube
