= Clement Cheng =

Hong Kong-Canadian screenwriter and movie director

- 鄭思傑
- Born: Cheng Sze-Kit; Hong Kong
- Occupations: Film director Screenwriter; Visual effects art director
- Notable work: Gallants

Clement Sze-Kit Cheng (Chinese: 鄭思傑) is a Hong Kong-Canadian screenwriter, film director, and visual effects art director.

== Early life ==
Born in Hong Kong, Cheng moved to Canada with his family as a child. In 1997, he returned to Hong Kong to witness the transfer of its sovereignty to China, and decided to stay.

== Film career ==
At the 29th Hong Kong Film Awards, Cheng and Derek Kwok won the Hong Kong Film Award for Best Director conjointly. Despite never having personally practiced any martial arts, Cheng co-wrote and co-directed Gallants, a martial arts film, with Kwok. The actors Cheng and Kwok chose for the film were primarily people who had acted in 1970s and 1980s Hong Kong cinema. The film had its Canadian premiere at the 2010 Fantasia Festival, and Cheng was in attendance. He also attended the film's United Kingdom premiere at the 2011 Terracotta Far East Film Festival. At the 30th Hong Kong Film Awards, Gallants was announced to have won the Hong Kong Film Award for Best Film, at which point Cheng jumped from his seat and began hugging the film's cast members. Cheng was in charge of the visual effects for contemporary fantasy film Rest on Your Shoulder and costume drama The Great Magician.

== Filmography ==
Title	Release date	Studio	Budget	Box office
Gallants	June 4, 2010	Focus Films	?	$585,848
