= UMA Racing =

Malaysian brand of aftermarket motorcycle parts

Uma-Racing
- Type: Private Limited Company
- Industry: Motorcycle aftermarket
- Founded: 2002
- Founder: Lee Meng Tek and Jason Yong
- Headquarters: Puchong, Selangor, Malaysia
- Area served: Malaysia, Thailand, Vietnam, Philippines, Singapore, Greece, Indonesia, Cambodia and Bermuda
- Key people: Lee Meng Tek, Jason Yong, Sam Lee, Lee Meng Chun (Director) and Bruce Lee (CEO)
- Products: Motorcycle Parts
- Number of employees: 100
- Website: https://umaracing.com/

Uma-Racing is a Malaysian brand of aftermarket motorcycle parts. It manufactures high cam, gear box, carburetor, clutch disc, valve, superhead and other parts.

== History ==
Uma Racing was established in September 2002 as a joint venture between Meng Kah Auto Parts Trading Sdn Bhd and Maju Motor Racing.

== Dealership and distributor ==
There are over thousand of local authorized dealers in Malaysia, covering Peninsular Malaysia, Sabah and Sarawak. Besides, Uma Racing also distributes to Singapore, Philippines, Thailand, Vietnam, Greece, Indonesia, Cambodia and Bermuda. france
