= Brown Willy effect =

Weather phenomenon

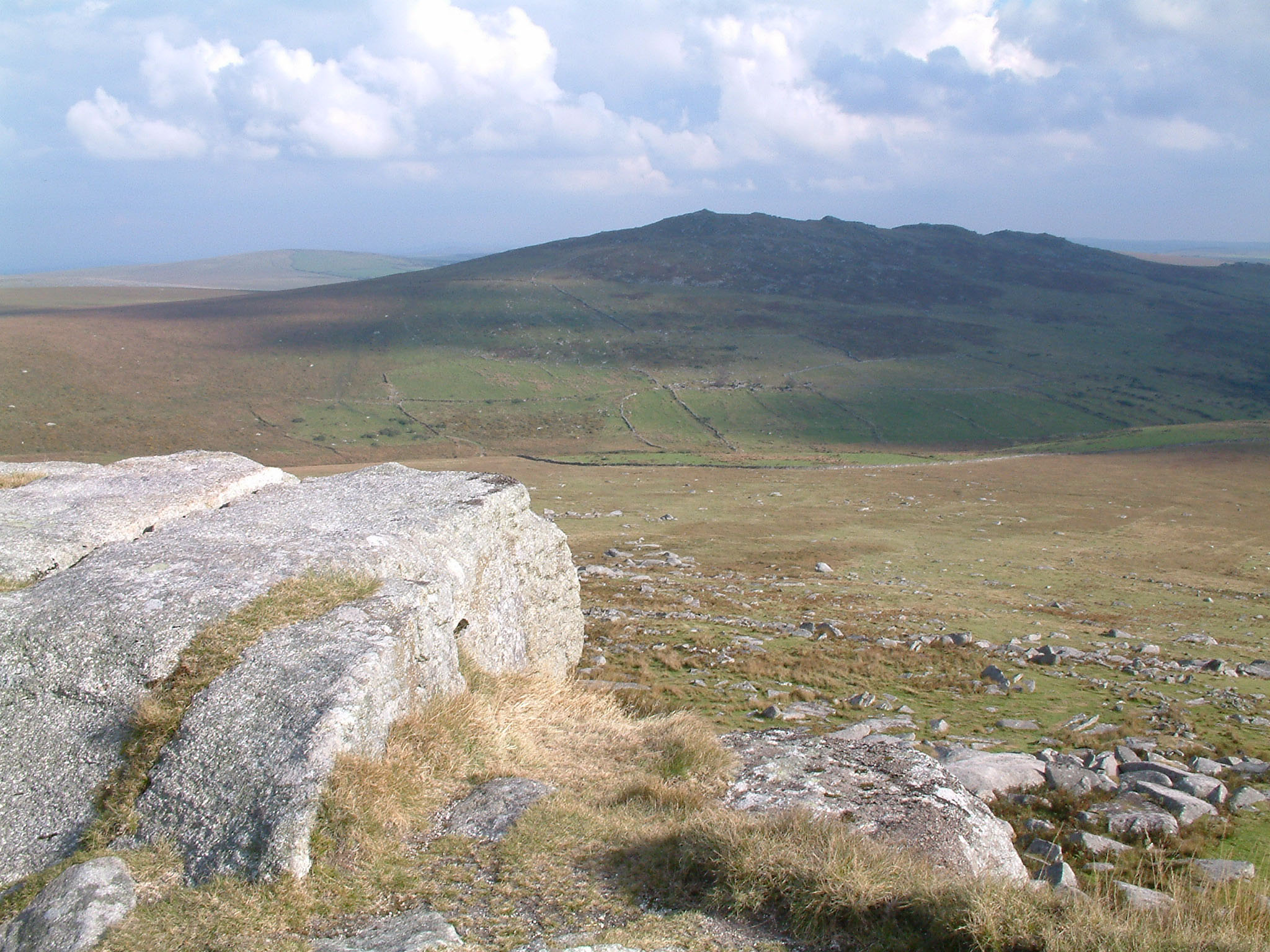
Brown Willy, highest point in Cornwall

The Brown Willy effect is a particular example of a meteorological phenomenon known as peninsular convergence, which sometimes occurs in the south-west of Great Britain. It leads to heavy showers developing over the high ground of Bodmin Moor in Cornwall, which then often travel a considerable distance downwind of their place of origin. The effect is named after the hill, Brown Willy, the highest point on the moor and in Cornwall as a whole. It is thought that the Boscastle flood of 2004 was caused by a particularly extreme example.

== Cause ==
Cornwall lies in the path of prevailing mild, moist westerly or south-westerly winds that blow in from the Atlantic Ocean. As these hit land, they are slowed by the effect of friction. Winds near the south coast tend to be diverted to a more northerly direction (backed), this creates a convergence zone near the central/northern spine of the peninsula, leading to uplift and condensation of the moisture borne by them. The uplift is intensified by the altitude of the land on Bodmin Moor.

Furthermore, in the summer, the land heats more than the sea, which causes sea breezes to establish during the day. Converging sea breeze fronts from the north and south coasts of Cornwall can lead to very rapid convection developing over the moor, which may result in very heavy showers or thunderstorms.

Once the showers have formed, they often travel in an easterly or north-easterly direction, driven by the prevailing wind. This causes a thin line of showers to occur along the length of the south-west peninsula, all originating from the Bodmin Moor area, which are often intensified further by the downwind high ground of Dartmoor and the Blackdown Hills. Places directly in the path of these showers suffer a series of heavy downpours, whilst nearby locations remain dry. An example of this effect occurred on 23 August 2004. Similarly, on 27 March 2006, a continuous line of showers stretched from Bodmin Moor to Burford, Oxfordshire — a distance of about 145 miles (233 km).

== See also ==
- Pembrokeshire Dangler
- Puget Sound Convergence Zone
