= Convergence zone =

Region in the atmosphere

Mesoscale sea breezes in Cuba converge from both coasts to form lines of cumulus.

A convergence zone in meteorology is a region in the atmosphere where two prevailing flows meet and interact, usually resulting in distinctive weather conditions. This causes a mass accumulation that eventually leads to a vertical movement and to the formation of clouds and precipitation. Large-scale convergence, called synoptic-scale convergence, is associated with weather systems such as baroclinic troughs, low-pressure areas, and cyclones. The large-scale convergence zone formed over the equator, the Intertropical Convergence Zone, has condensed and intensified as a result of the global increase in temperature. Small-scale convergence will give phenomena from isolated cumulus clouds to large areas of thunderstorms.

The inverse of convergence is divergence, such as the horse latitudes.

== Large scale ==
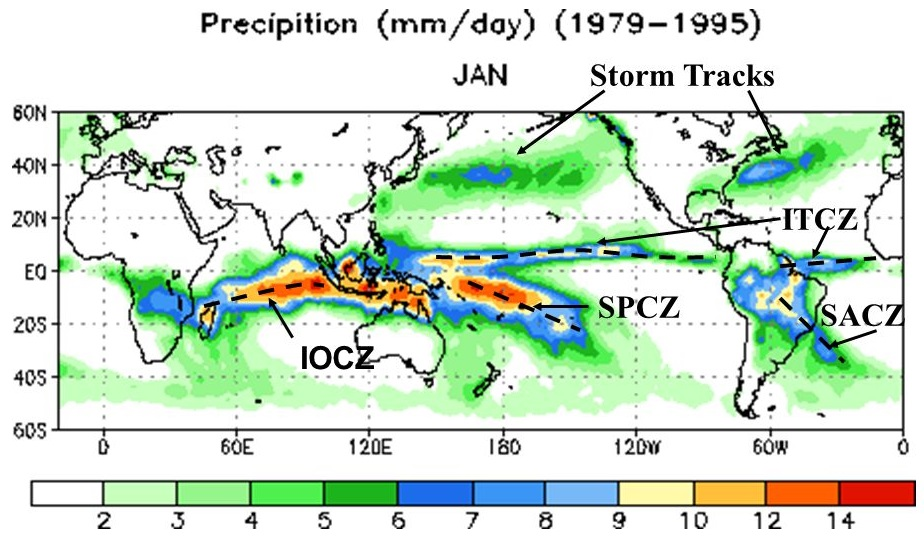

An example of a convergence zone is the Intertropical Convergence Zone (ITCZ), a low pressure area which girdles the Earth at the Equator. Another example is the South Pacific convergence zone that extends from the western Pacific Ocean toward French Polynesia.

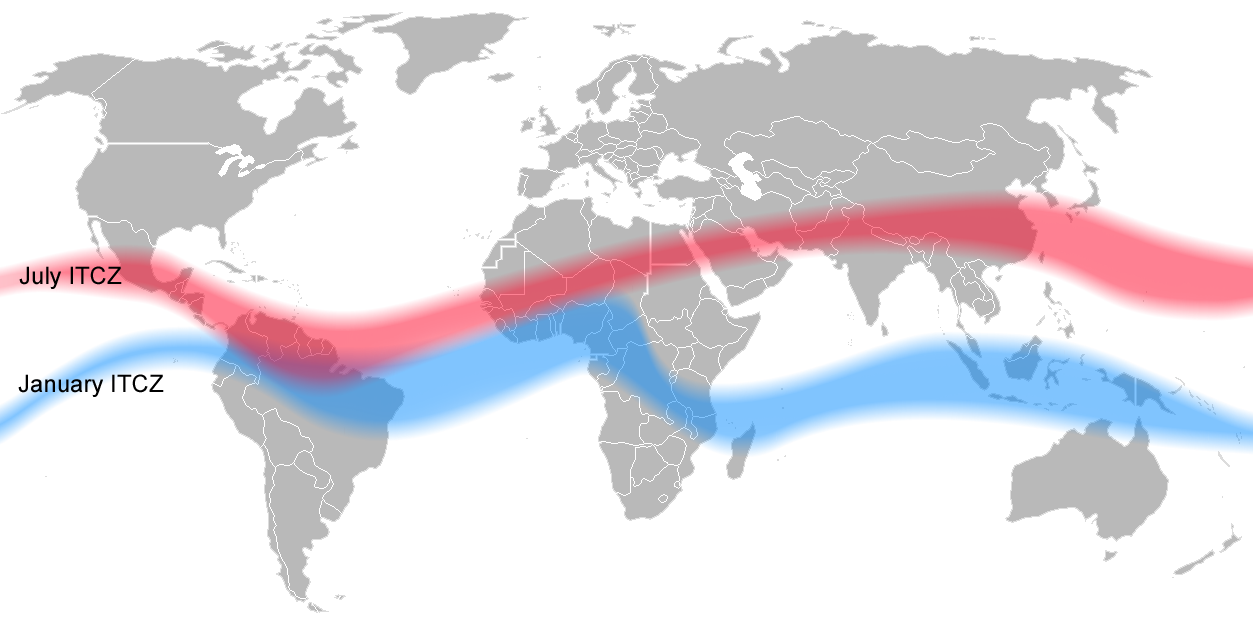
The ITCZ shifts with the tilt of the earth, coinciding with the changing of seasons.

The ITCZ is the result of the northeasterly trade winds and southeasterly trade winds converging in an area of high latent heat and low pressure. As the two trade winds converge, the cool, dry air collects moisture from the warm ocean and rises, contributing to cloud formation and precipitation. The low pressure area that is created by the movement of the trade winds acts as a vacuum, drawing in the cooler, dry air from high pressure areas (divergence zones), creating a convection cell commonly known as the Hadley Cell.

Sea surface temperature is directly related to the position of the Sun or the location of the "energy flux equator," thus the ITCZ shifts corresponding to the seasons. Due to the position of the Sun, the sea surface temperature near the equator (30°S to 30°N), during an equinox, is higher than any other latitudes. During the summer solstice in the Northern Hemisphere (June 21), the ITCZ is shifted north, following the position of the Sun. The ITCZ is shifted farther south during the winter solstice (in the Northern Hemisphere), when the solar radiation is focused at 23.5°S.

== Mesoscale ==
Convergence zones also occur at a smaller scale. Convergence lines form rows of showers or thunderstorms over a more local area. Sea breezes colliding can trigger development of a convergence line. The heavy rain caused in a short period of time can cause severe flooding.

Some examples are the Puget Sound Convergence Zone which occurs in the Puget Sound region in the U.S. state of Washington; Mohawk–Hudson convergence in the U.S. state of New York; the Elsinore Convergence Zone in the U.S. state of California; the Brown Willy effect which can be generated when south-westerly winds blow over Bodmin Moor in Cornwall; and the Pembrokeshire Dangler which can form when northerly winds blow down the Irish Sea. Flooding in Boscastle, Cornwall, England in August 2004 was the result of thunderstorms developing on a convergence line.
