= Disposition (disambiguation) =

A disposition is a tendency to act in a specified way.

Disposition may also refer to:

- Disposition (law), a final decision or settlement
- Disposition (Scots law), a formal deed transferring ownership of corporeal heritable property (typically land)
- Disposition (harpsichord), the set of choirs of strings on a harpsichord
- "Disposition" (song), a 2001 progressive metal song by Tool
- Testamentary disposition, any gift of any property by a testator under the terms of a will
- Disposition (math), an uncommon way to refer to permutation of n elements over k positions.
- Disposition of human corpses, such as burial or cremation

== See also ==
- Dispositional attribution
- Disposal (disambiguation)
- Dispose
- Dispositionalism
