= Mohawk–Hudson convergence =

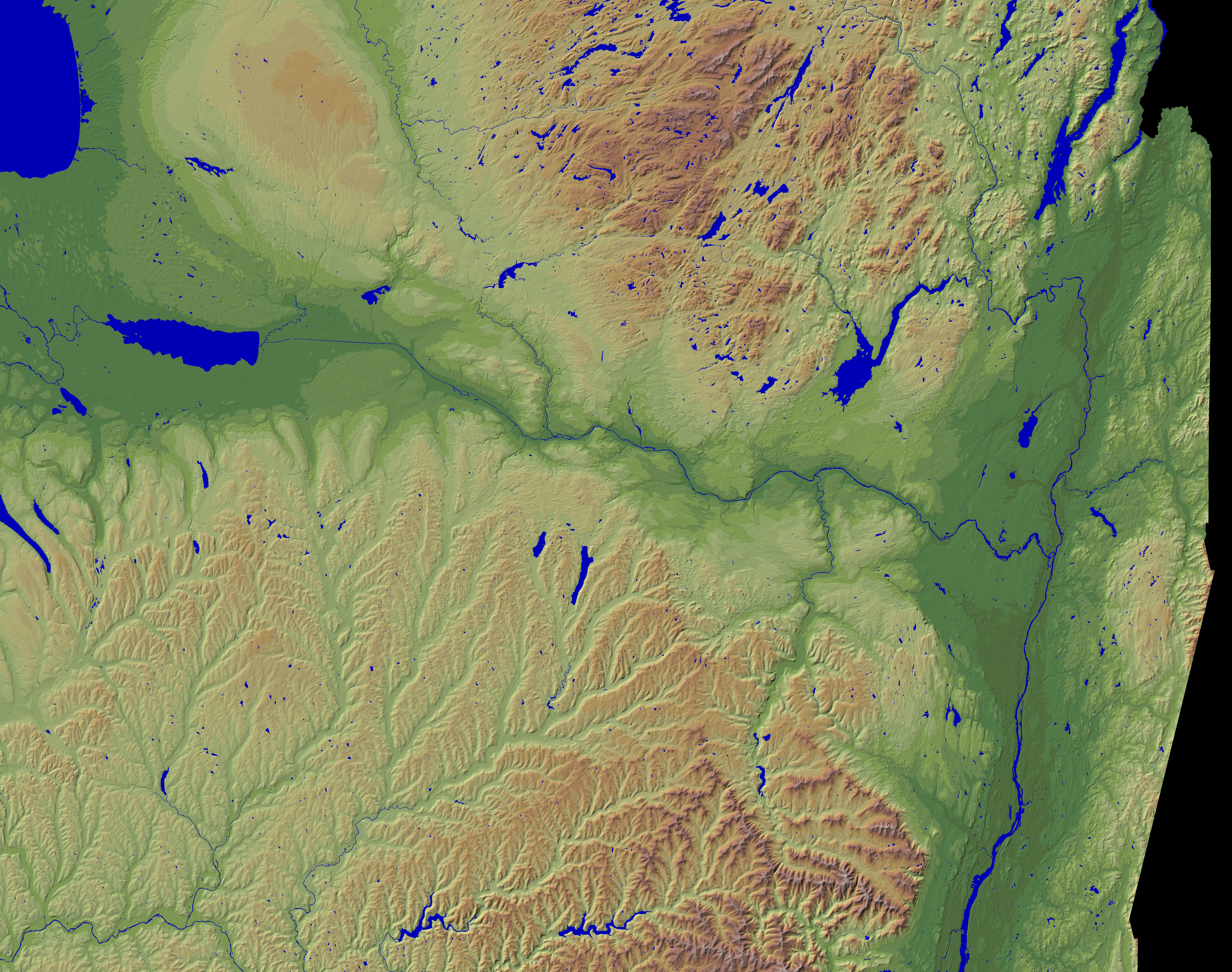
Land relief map showing the convergence of the Mohawk (west–east) and Hudson (north–south) river valleys

Mohawk–Hudson convergence (MHC) is a mesoscale meteorology phenomenon occurring over the Capital District region of upstate New York, United States. The small convergence zone forms within specific weather conditions sometimes found in the wake of extratropical cyclones shifting east of the area. Given air pressure decreasing with both longitude and latitude, as well as weak synoptic low-level flow, winds are channeled east along the Mohawk Valley and south through the Hudson Valley, converging over Albany. With sufficient moisture in the lower atmosphere, a localized area of precipitation may form where the valleys meet, extending for several miles around Albany. The process manifests primarily in the lowest 2,500 ft (760 m) of the atmosphere.

MHC-induced precipitation occurs predominately in the winter. It typically produces low clouds and light snowfall, often locally prolonging significant snow events by several hours. The strongest MHC events may yield snowfall rates approaching 1 in (2.5 cm) per hour. Occasionally, MHC contributes to shower and thunderstorm formation in the warm season. In early August 2008, two days of training thunderstorms over the Capital District were attributed to MHC; the result was locally heavy rain, amounting to over 1 in (25 mm).

A relatively rare variation of MHC, termed "Southern Mohawk–Hudson convergence" (SMHC), occurs in the summer, when a southwesterly wind is present in advance of an approaching cold front. In that scenario, the Hudson and Mohawk valleys may direct the flow to become more southerly and westerly, respectively, yielding the formation of thunderstorms around Albany when conditions permit. As with MHC, SMHC is most pronounced in the absence of mechanisms for strong synoptic ascent over the region. Whereas the effects of the convergence zone are generally insignificant in the winter, SMHC presents more of a forecasting challenge when thunderstorms rapidly develop threaten and to impede travel at Albany International Airport. Thunderstorms associated with SMHC have the potential to become severe.
