= Motorcycle components =

Motorcycle components and systems for a motorcycle are engineered, manufactured, and assembled in order to produce motorcycle models with the desired performance, aesthetics, and cost but can also be customized. The key components of modern motorcycles are presented below.

== Chassis ==
The chassis of a motorcycle includes the frame and suspension, along with the front forks, of the vehicle.

=== Frame ===
The frame is typically made from welded aluminium or steel (or alloy) struts, with the rear suspension being an integral component in the design. Carbon fibre, titanium, and magnesium are used in a few very expensive custom frames.

The frame includes the head tube that holds the front fork and allows it to pivot. Some motorcycles include the engine as a load-bearing stressed member; this has been used all through motorcycle history but is now becoming more common.

Oil-in-frame (Oif) chassis, where the lubricating oil is stored in the frame of the motorcycle, was used for Vincent Motorcycles of the 1950s, and for a while during the 1970s on some NVT British motorcycles. It was widely unpopular and generally regarded as a bad idea at the time. Today it is a used on some "thumpers" (single-cylinder four-strokes) that usually have dry-sump lubrication requiring an external oil tank. It has since gained some cachet in the modern custom bike world too because of the space savings it can afford and the reference to an earlier era.

Buell motorcycles employed a similar design with the oil held in the swingarm and fuel held in the frame.

=== Suspension ===
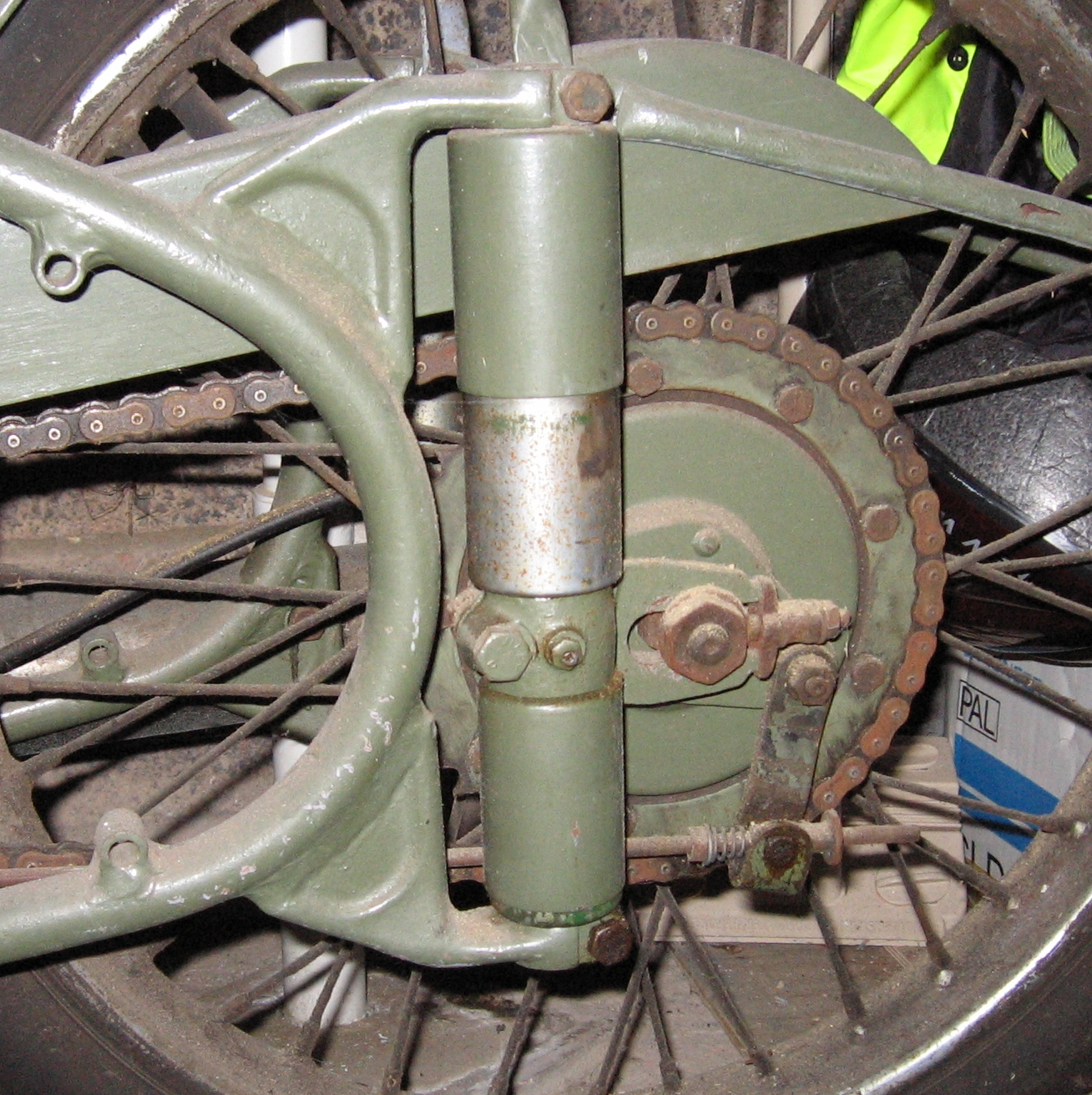
Plunger design suspensions, as on this BSA Bantam, were superseded by the swinging arm

Modern designs have the two wheels of a motorcycle connected to the chassis by a suspension arrangement, however 'chopper' style motorcycles often elect to forgo rear suspension, using a rigid frame.

The front suspension is usually built into the front fork and may consist of telescoping tubes called fork tubes which contain the suspension inside or some multibar linkage that incorporate the suspension externally. There is another type of front suspension system which is Earles type which highly used in off-road motorcycles.

The rear suspension supports the swingarm, which is attached via the swingarm pivot bolt to the frame and holds the axle of the rear wheel. The rear suspension can consist of several shock arrangements:

- Dual shocks, which are placed at the far ends of the swingarm
- Traditional monoshock, which is placed at the front of the swingarm, above the swingarm pivot bolt
- Softail style suspension, where the shock absorbers are mounted horizontally in front of the swingarm, below the swingarm pivot bolt and operate in extension.

=== Fuel tank ===
A fuel tank (also called a petrol tank or gas tank) is a safe container for flammable fluids. Though any storage tank for fuel may be so called, the term is typically applied to part of an engine system in which the fuel is stored and propelled (fuel pump) or released (pressurized gas) into an engine.

=== Front fork ===
A motorcycle fork is the portion of a motorcycle that holds the front wheel and allows one to steer. For handling, the front fork is the most critical part of a motorcycle. The combination of rake and trail determines how stable the motorcycle is.

The 'fork' on a motorcycle consists of multiple components. The triple trees (also known as yokes) hold the fork tubes (which contain the fork springs), and are fastened to the neck of the frame by the steering stem. At the bottom of the fork tubes are the lower legs, often referred to as sliders. The sliders house the dampening assemblies, which vary based on the brand and type of fork. The front axle is located perpendicular and engages the sliders. The handlebars are clamped to the top triple tree and allow the rider to steer the motorcycle.

== Engine ==
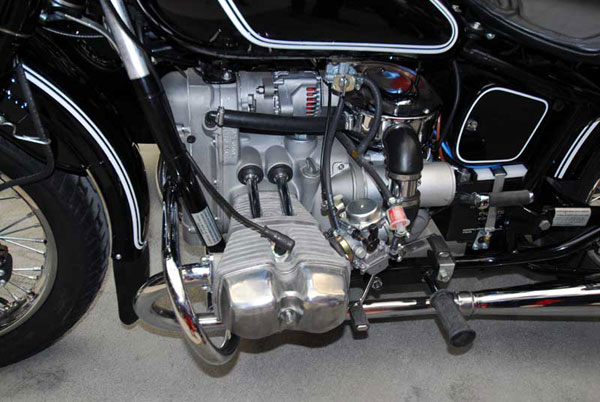
Opposed twin engine on a Ural

Almost all commercially available motorcycles are driven by conventional gasoline internal combustion engines, but some small scooter-type models use an electric motor, and a very small number of diesel models exist (e.g., the USMC M1030 M1 version of the Kawasaki KLR650 and the Dutch-produced Track T-800CDI).

Motorcycle engines range from less than 50 cc (cubic centimetres), commonly found in many small scooters, to 5735 cc, a Chevrolet V8 engine, currently used by Boss Hoss in its cruiser style motorcycle.

Motorcycles have mostly, but not exclusively, been produced with one to four cylinders, and designers have tried virtually every imaginable layout. The most common engine configurations today are the single and twin, the V-twin, the opposed twin (or boxer), and the in-line triple and in-line four. A number of others designs have reached mass production, including the V-4, the flat 6-cylinder, the flat 4-cylinder, the in-line 6-cylinder, and the Wankel engine. Exotic engines, such as a radial piston engine, sometimes appear in custom built motorcycles, though two firms Megola and Redrup put radial-engined motorcycles into production.

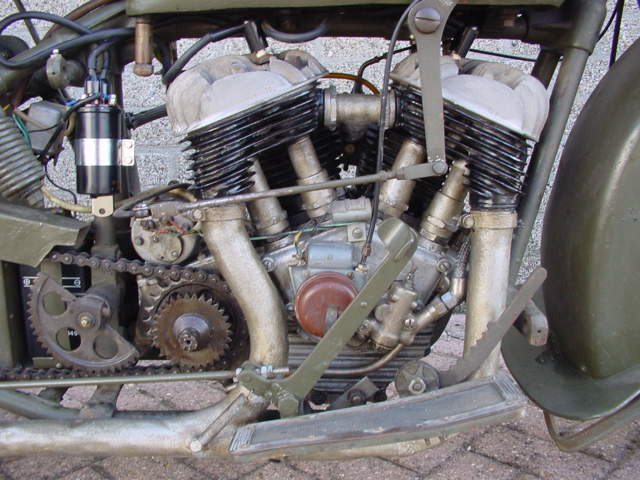
A Sokół 1000 V-twin engine

Engines with more cylinders for the same displacement feel smoother to ride. Engines with fewer cylinders are cheaper, lighter, and easier to maintain. Liquid-cooled motorcycles have a radiator which is the primary way their heat is dispersed. Coolant or oil is constantly circulated between this radiator and the cylinder when the engine is running. Air-cooled motorcycles rely on air blowing past fins on the piston cylinder head and/or engine case to disperse heat. Liquid-cooled motorcycles have the potential for greater power at a given displacement, tighter tolerances, and longer operating life, whereas air-cooled motorcycles are potentially cheaper to purchase, less mechanically complex and are lighter.

An air-cooled engine contracts and expands with its wider temperature range, requiring looser tolerances, and giving shorter engine life. The temperature range of an air-cooled two-stroke is even more extreme and component life even shorter than in an air-cooled four-stroke.

As applied to motorcycles, two-stroke engines have some advantages over equivalent four-stroke engines: they are lighter, mechanically much simpler, and produce more power when operating at the high rpm power-band. But four-stroke engines are cleaner, more reliable, and deliver power over a much broader range of engine speeds. In developed countries, two-stroke road-bikes are rare, because—in addition to the reasons above—modifying them to meet contemporary emissions standards is prohibitively expensive. Almost all modern two-strokes are single-cylinder, liquid-cooled, and under 600 cc.

In November 2006, the Dutch company E.V.A. Products BV Holland announced that its diesel motorcycle, the Track T-800CDI, achieved production status. The Track T-800CDI uses an 800 cc three-cylinder Daimler Chrysler diesel engine. Other manufacturers, including Royal Enfield, had been producing diesel-powered bikes since at least the 1980s. Also, Intelligent Energy, an English alternative-fuel company, is developing a motorcycle powered by a detachable hydrogen-powered fuel cell, which it calls an Emissions Neutral Vehicle (ENV). According to reports, the vehicle can sustain speeds of 80 km/h while making virtually no noise, and can run for up to four hours without refuelling.

== Transmission ==
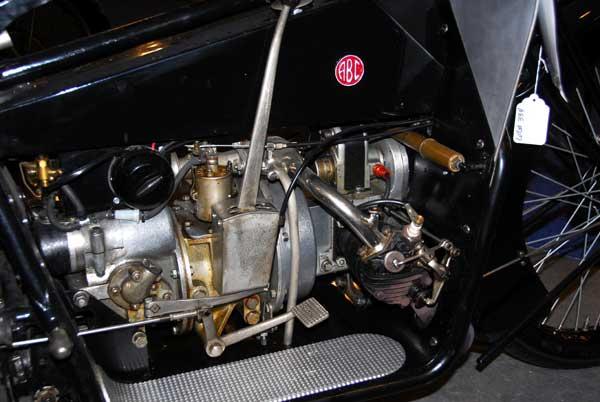
The transmission on this 1921 ABC motorcycle is located behind the engine and shifts by a long hand-operated lever on its right side.

Most motorcycles have a sequential manual transmission shifted by a foot lever. Some (mostly smaller) motorcycles, and many scooters use either a continuously variable transmission, or a hydraulic automatic transmission. semi-automatic transmissions are also in use; where the driver's input is still required for shifting gears, but the clutch system is controlled and operated automatically. These systems are mostly found on smaller dirt bikes (e.g., minibikes; such as pit bikes), underbones, many older mopeds and scooters, and various other types of motorcycles.

Engine power can be engaged or interrupted through the clutch, typically an arrangement of plates stacked in alternating fashion, one geared on the inside to the engine and the next geared on the outside to the transmission input shaft.

== Final drive ==
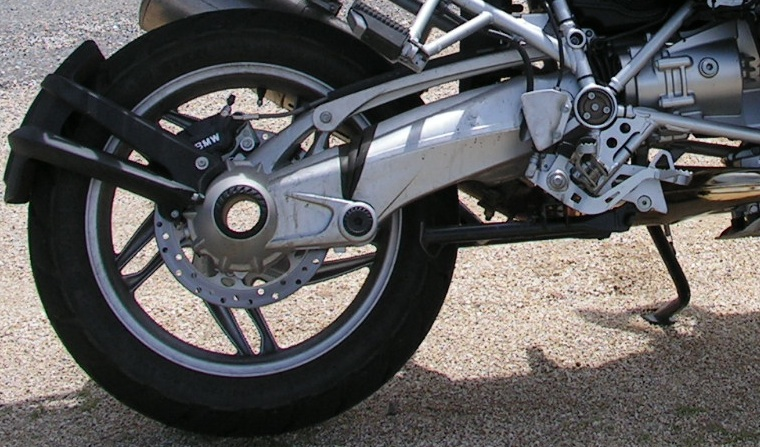
A shaft final drive is housed within a rear swingarm of a BMW R1200GS

Power transfer from the gearbox to the rear wheel is accomplished by different methods.

Chain-drive uses sprockets and a roller chain, which requires both lubrication and adjustment for elongation (stretch) that occurs through wear. The lubricant is subject to being thrown off the fast-moving chain and results in grime and dirt build-up. Chains do deteriorate, and excessive wear on the front and rear sprockets can be dangerous. In a chain-drive, the power is transmitted into the rear wheel via a cush drive. Conventional roller chain-drives suffer the potential for vibration, as the effective radius of action in a chain and sprocket combination constantly changes during the revolution ("chordal action"). If a drive sprocket rotates at constant RPM, then the chain (and the driven sprocket) must accelerate and decelerate constantly. Most chain-driven motorcycles are fitted with a rubber bushed rear wheel hub to eliminate this vibration issue. Belt-drive and shaft-drive are also used.

=== Chain lubrication ===
Small budget motorcycles may have a totally enclosed drive chain, but this is rare on larger motorcycles, an exception being the Norton rotary bikes. To prevent rapid wear of the chain and sprockets, it is customary to apply an adhesive petroleum, graphite or silicon based composite chain-lube via an aerosol. Many riders also fit aftermarket chain-oilers to feed a regular supply of oil to the chain at the rear sprocket. These chain oilers vary in sophistication, but all add significantly to the life of the chain. The custom of lubing by immersing the chain in a tin of hot grease ceased in the early 1970s, once most chains had rubber "O'-rings. The original Suzuki RE5 of 1975 came with a rear chain oiler, but the 1976 model had a sealed chain, and its oiler was deleted as "unnecessary".

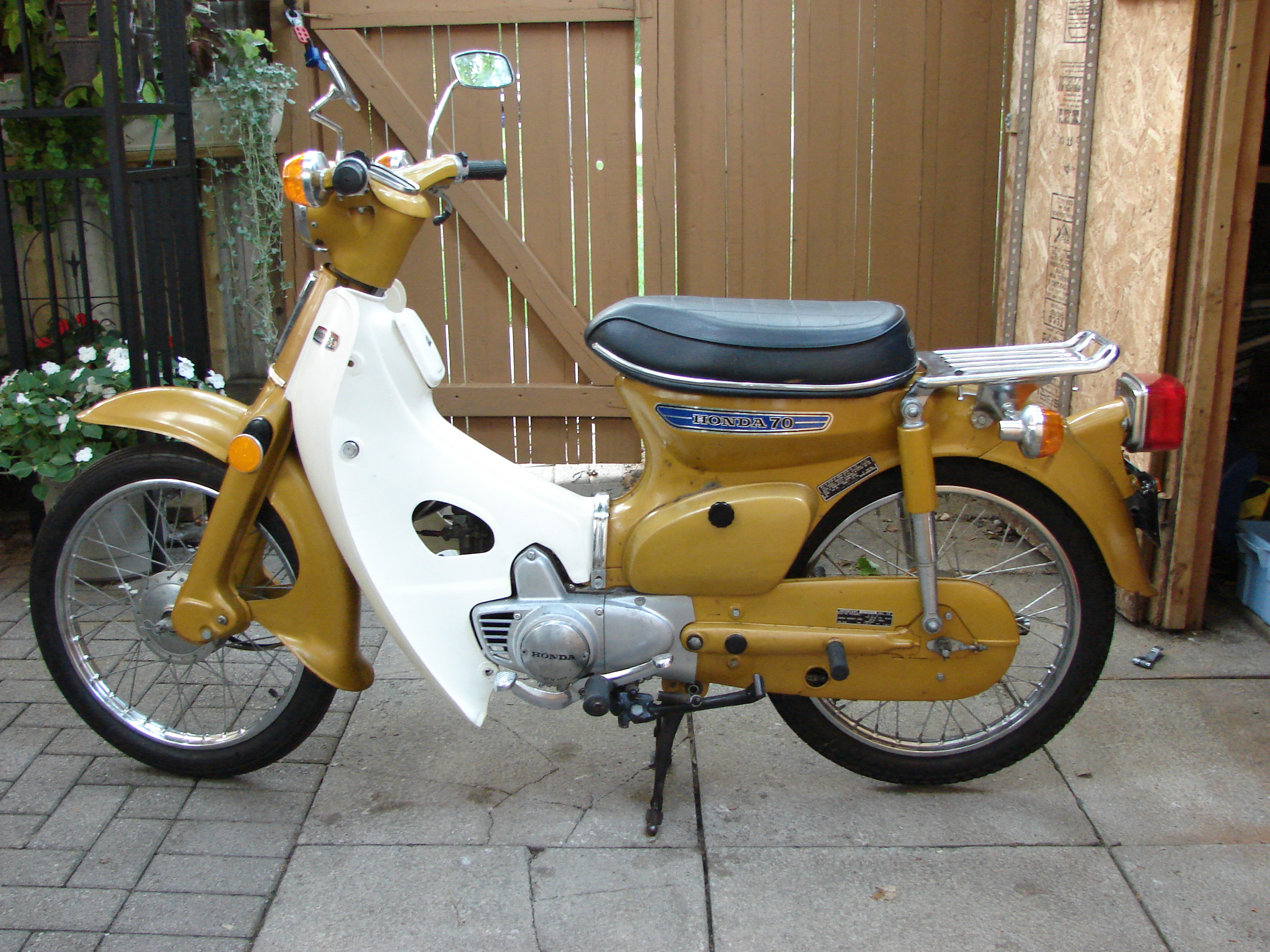
A Honda step-thru with an enclosed chain

A belt-drive is still subject to stretch but operates very quietly, cleanly, and efficiently. A toothed belt is frequently used. However, they are not as durable when subjected to high horsepower as a chain. You can not alter the length and change final drive ratios as easily as chains. They also can not wrap as closely around chains. And require larger pulleys compared to chain sprockets to get an effective final drive ratio. Replacing a drive belt typically requires removal of the swingarm, since belts cannot be split the way a chain with a master link can.

A shaft-drive is usually completely enclosed; the visual cue is a tube extending from the rear of the transmission to a bell housing on the rear wheel. Inside the bell housing a bevel gear on the shaft mates with another on the wheel mount. This arrangement is superior in terms of noise and cleanliness and is virtually maintenance-free, with the exception of occasional fluid changes. They are the most durable and usually last the life of the motorcycle. However, the additional gear sets are a source of power loss and added weight. A shaft-equipped motorcycle may also be susceptible to shaft effect.

Virtually all high-performance racing motorcycles use chain-drive because they are the most mechanically efficient transmitting power to the rear wheel.

== Wheels ==
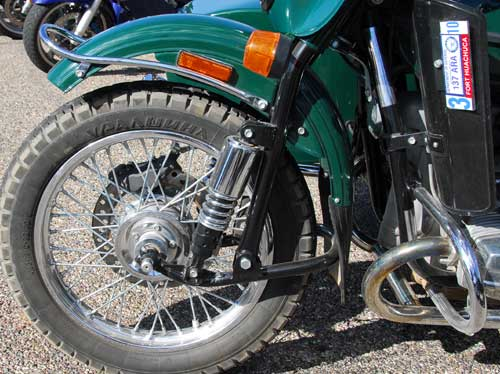
A wire wheel and pneumatic motorcycle tire on a Ural

The wheel rims are usually steel or aluminum (generally with steel spokes and an aluminum hub) or mag-type cast or machined aluminum. Cast magnesium disks, produced by one-step hot forging from magnesium alloys ZK60 and MA-14, are also used for many motorcycle wheels.

At one time, motorcycles used wire wheels built up from separate components, but, except for dirtbikes, one-piece wheels are more common now. Performance racing motorcycles often use carbon-fibre wheels, but the expense of these wheels is prohibitively high for general usage.

== Tires ==
Motorcycles mainly use pneumatic tires. However, in some cases where punctures are common (some enduros), the tires are filled with a tire mousse which is unpunctureable. Both types of tire come in many configurations. The most important characteristic of any tire is the contact patch, the small area that is in contact with the road surface while riding. There are tires designed for dirt bikes, touring, sport and cruiser bikes.

Dirt bike tires have knobbly, deep treads for maximum grip on loose dirt, mud, or gravel; such tires tend to be less stable and noisier on paved surfaces.

Sport or performance tires are designed to provide maximum grip for street use on paved surfaces but tend to wear faster.

Touring tires are usually made of a harder rubber compound for greater durability, these may last longer but tend to provide less outright grip compared to sports tires at optimal operating temperatures. Touring tires typically offer more grip at lower temperatures and can be more suited to riding in cold or winter conditions where a sport tire may never reach its optimal operating temperature.

Cruiser and sport touring tires are designed to compromise between grip and durability. These tend to have stronger sidewalls as they are typically fitted to heavier machines.

Motorsport or racing tires offer the highest of levels of grip. Due to the high temperatures at which these tires typically operate, use outside a racing environment is unsafe, typically these tires do not reach their optimum temperature which provides less than optimal grip. In racing situations, tires are normally brought up to temperature in advance based on application and conditions through the use of tire warmers.

== Brakes (disc/drum) ==
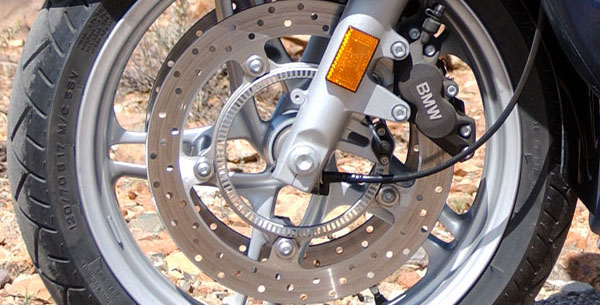
Front disk brakes with an ABS sensor ring on a BMW R1200RT

There are generally two independent brakes on a motorcycle, one set on the front wheel and one on the rear. However, some models have "linked brakes" whereby both can be applied at the same time using only one control.

Front brakes are generally much more effective than rear brakes: roughly two thirds of stopping power comes from the front brake—mainly as a result of weight transfer being much more pronounced compared to longer or lower vehicles, because of the motorcycle's short wheelbase relative to its center of mass height. This can result in brake dive.

Brakes can either be drum or disc based, with disc brakes being more common on large, modern or more expensive motorcycles for their far superior stopping power, particularly in wet conditions. There are many brake-performance-enhancing aftermarket parts available for most motorcycles, including brake pads of varying compounds and steel-braided brake lines.

Harley-Davidson replaced drum brakes with disc brakes on Big Twin models starting in 1972, and on Sportster models starting in 1973.

In 1981, BMW introduced an antilock braking system (ABS) on a motorcycle. Other manufacturers have since also adopted this technology. ABS is normally found on motorcycles of 500 cc or greater engine capacity, although it is available on motor scooters down to 49 cc.

== Instruments ==
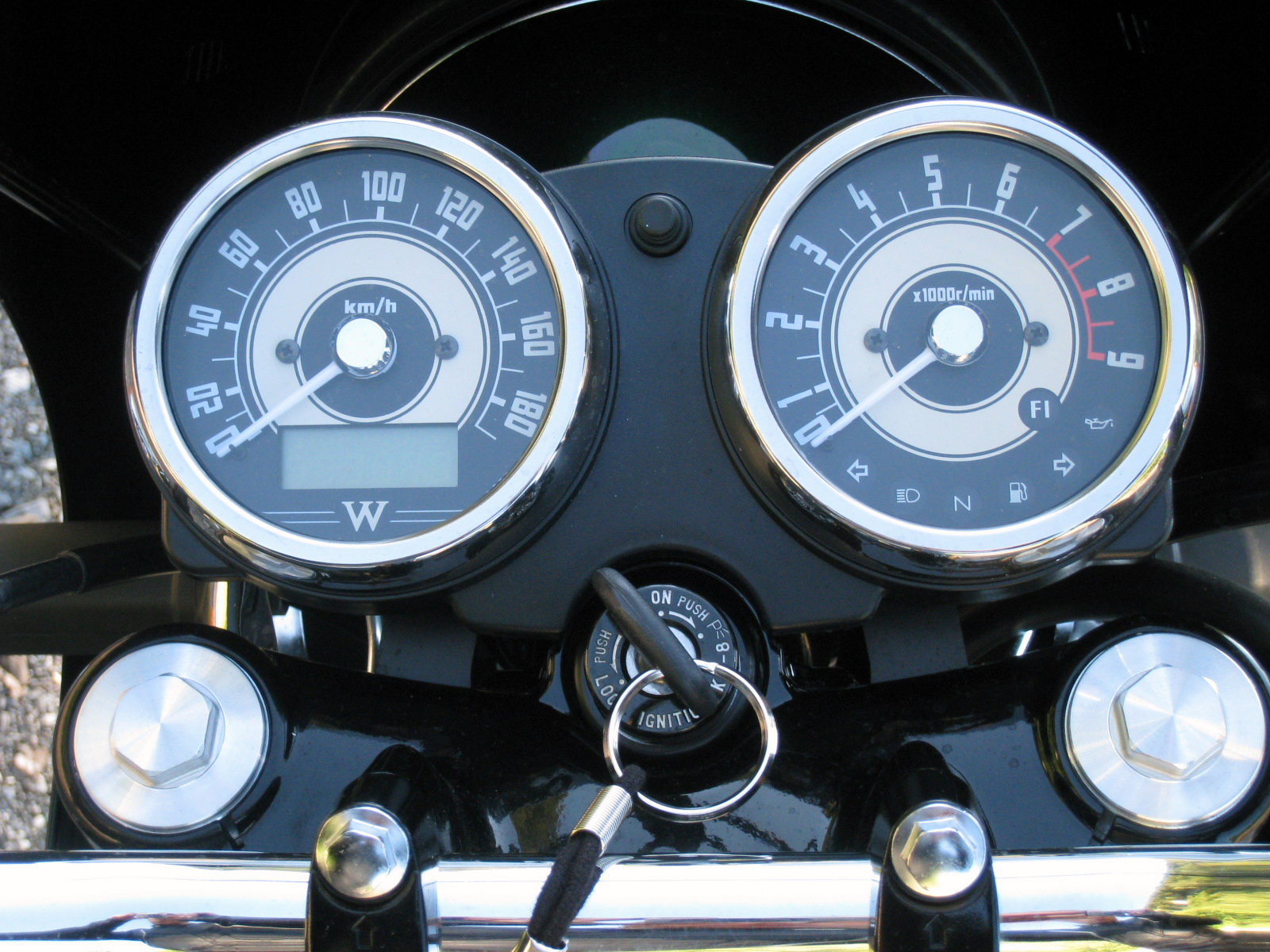
Instruments of Kawasaki W800

Most road motorcycles have an instrument panel, usually consisting of speedometer, odometer and tachometer.

Fuel gauges are becoming more common, but traditionally a reserve tank arrangement is used with a petcock (petrol tap) on the side of the motorcycle allowing the rider to switch to a reserve fuel supply when the main fuel supply is exhausted. There is not actually a separate reserve tank: The intake for the petcock has two pipes, one extending higher into the fuel tank than the other. When fuel no longer covers the longer pipe the engine will lose power/splutter and the rider switches the petcock to the "reserve" setting, which accesses the shorter pipe. Riders whose bikes lack a fuel gauge (most machines prior to the past few years) usually learn how far they can go with a full tank of fuel, and then use a trip meter if available to judge when they must refill the tank.

== Lighting system ==
There should be no lights and indicators for a race bike or race machine because the bike should be less in weight.

Because of safety and vehicle laws, any motorcycle that's not for racing will have some degree of a lighting system that consists of low and high beam head lamps, brake indication and running lights and turn indicators. Lighting can vary from incandescent filament lamps, gas charged lamps with halogen or argon gas filled bulbs, and in recent years, LED's. The lighting system will always function if the ignition is turned to the ON position. The low and high beam controller and the turn signal controls are usually placed on an easily operated and accessible cluster next to the hand grips. The brake light is engaged when either the front or rear brakes are applied by the use of spring loaded contacts near the front brake lever or the rear brake peddle. The lighting system uses a simple fuse box to separate the systems components and is connected to a battery. Some large touring bikes also incorporate the use of running lights or decorative accessory lights to make them more visible to other drivers at night. Some manufacturers have added a strobe effect to the headlamps to make other drivers more aware of the oncoming motorcycle. A large percentage of motorcycle accidents occur because other drivers don't see motorcycles in traffic.

== Ignition key switch ==
An ignition switch, starter switch or start switch is a key switch in the control system of a motor vehicle that activates the main electrical systems for the vehicle. In vehicles powered by internal combustion engines, the switch provides power to the starter solenoid and the ignition system components (including the engine control unit and ignition coil), and is frequently combined with the starter switch which activates the starter motor.

== See also ==
- Bicycle and motorcycle dynamics
- Shaft effect
