= Ceiling (disambiguation) =

A ceiling is the upper surface of a room.

Ceiling may also refer to:

- Ceiling function in mathematics
- Glass ceiling, a barrier to advancement of a qualified person
- Ceiling (aeronautics), the maximum density altitude an aircraft can reach under a set of conditions
- Price ceiling, an imposed limit on the price of a product
- Ceiling (cloud), the height above ground at which (accumulated) cloud layers cover more than 50% of the sky
- Ceilings (album), an album by Dentist
- "The Ceiling" (short story), a 2001 short story by American writer Kevin Brockmeier
- The Ceiling (album), a 2019 album by Jaws
- Katto, also known as The Ceiling, a short film that competed in the Short Film Palme d'Or group at the 2017 Cannes Film Festival
- "Ceilings" (song), a 2022 song by Lizzy McAlpine
- The Ceiling, a 1961 film by Věra Chytilová

== See also ==
- Ceiling effect (disambiguation)
