= Cush drive =

A cush drive is a feature in a motorcycle or scooter drive-train that is designed to reduce stress on drivetrain components during gear or throttle changes. A common design used by almost all street motorcycles has three major pieces: the wheel, the sprocket assembly, and a rubber damper system between the wheel and sprocket. The rubber damper system typically consists of rubber blocks that damp the transfer of force between metal components and effectively reduces wear and fatigue of the metal components. Another popular system incorporates metallic compression type coil springs placed between the input and output shafts of the cush drive assembly.

The cush drive was invented by Royal Enfield in 1912 for use on their 425cc V-twin.
