= Tamagotchi effect =

Development of emotional attachment to machines, robots or software agents

The Tamagotchi effect is the development of emotional attachment with machines, robots or software agents. It has been noticed that humans tend to attach emotionally to inanimate objects devoid of emotions of their own. For example, there are instances when people feel emotional about using their car keys, or with virtual pets. It is more prominent in applications which simulate or reflect some aspects of human behavior or characteristics, especially levels of artificial intelligence and automated knowledge processing.

== Tamagotchi toy ==
The Japanese toy Tamagotchi was released in 1996. As of 2010, more than 76 million Tamagotchis have been sold worldwide. This toy is an egg-shaped virtual pet from Japan. It is used by all ages. The user chooses an object, pet, or person to raise an egg to a creature. Another example of virtual pets is a virtual puppy game. In this game, the user takes the role of the mother or father to raise the puppy into an adult. The user feeds, bathes, and even plays with the virtual animal. The user gains an emotional attachment with the puppy which encourages the user to keep interacting with the pet and to be a good parent.

A criticism when the toy first came out was the life expectancy of the pet if left unattended. If the original versions were not attended to, the pet would 'die' within half a day, causing both emotional distress and them having to reset their device. This would cause owners to take their pet with them wherever they went, which resulted in distractions in their daily lives. This caused many schools to ban the use of Tamagotchis. Whilst this problem was negated in newer models by the addition of a pause feature, the "Tamagotchi effect" had already gained mainstream media attention.

=== Discussion of the effect ===
Researchers have discussed the Tamagotchi effect often since the device’s release. Whilst some say there is cause for concern in regards to attachments to non-living beings, others suggest it is a safe alternative to a real pet for those who may not be able to suitably take care of one, or that they could be used to 'practice' having a real pet, without the risk of hurting or neglecting one should someone's interests change.

After the "Tamagotchi effect" gained mainstream attention, researchers came up with the term, Tamagotchi-human cyborg to describe the seemingly symbiotic relationship between humans and Tamagotchis, in part satirizing the idea that because the Tamagotchi will die if not near a human, and that a human will become distressed if not near their Tamagotchi, that they should be considered part of the same being. This is further amplified by the trend to wear Tamagotchis as you would to clothing or jewelry.

The Tamagotchi effect has no limitations on who can or cannot encounter the effect. The effect is demonstrated by children, adults and elderly people, alike. Forms of therapy have been used with virtual pets on mentally challenged children and the elderly.

== Children's perspective ==
"In the 1960s through the 1980s, researchers in artificial intelligence took part in what we might call the classical "great AI debates" where the central question was whether machines could be "really" intelligent. This classical debate was essentialist; the new relational objects tend to enable researchers and their public to sidestep such arguments about what is inherent in the computer. Instead, the new objects depend on what people attribute to them; they shift the focus to what the objects evoke in us. When we are asked to care for an object (the robot Kismet, the plaything Furby), when the cared-for object thrives and offers us its attention and concern, people are moved to experience that object as intelligent. Beyond this, they feel a connection to it. So the question here is not to enter a debate about whether relational objects "really" have emotions, but to reflect on a series of issues having to do with what relational artifacts evoke in the user." In preliminary research done on children and Furbies researchers found that the children classified Furbies as "kind of alive". They classified the Furby as "kind of alive" because of their emotional attachment to it; for example, when asked "Do you think the Furby is alive?," children answer not in terms of what the Furby can do, but how they feel about the Furby and how the Furby might feel about them". "...[T]he computational object functions not only as an evocative model of mind, but as a kindred other. With these new objects, children (and adults) not only reflect on how their own mental and physical processes are analogous to the machine's, but perceive and relate to the machine as an autonomous and "almost alive" self". "By accepting a new category of relationship, with entities that they recognize as "sort-of-alive", or "alive in a different, but legitimate way," today's children will redefine the scope and shape of the playing field for social relations in the future. Because they are the first generation to grow up with this new paradigm, it is essential that we observe and document their experiences".

== Virtual 'friends' ==
Having friends and friendships is a vital piece to human interaction and well-being in today's society. Unfortunately, people may struggle for this basic need based on time restrictions and other commitments. Because of this, many are turning to the convenience of using technology to have a "virtual friend." These virtual friends are designed to interact with people in the same fashion as a human friend would. They can range from a simple handheld pet all the way to possessing individual personalities and emotions, as real people do. Those most likely to form emotional attachments are likely anxious-ambivalent individuals, who tend to experience high levels of distress and a need for strong relationships.

=== Advantages ===
Virtual ‘friends’ can provide people with a sense of security and self-confidence. This may be especially true in those who have difficulty communicating or interacting with others. People can look to their virtual friends for positive encouragement or just companionship.

=== Disadvantages ===
While these virtual ‘friends’ are doing a lot of good for people, there is also the need for concern on over-reliance. Depending so much on these figures could potentially lead to isolation from the real world. This may then, in turn, escalate to a difficulty of differentiating between reality and fantasy, which is especially influential in children.

== Marketing strategies ==
The definition of The Tamagotchi Effect and the attachment to these devices makes it possible for companies to market and profit from this effect. New research has found that customers often develop strong emotional ties to products and services they use. This suggests that companies can attract lifelong customers. Companies can adjust their marketing strategies to focus on these types of individuals, who stay faithful to brands that earn their trust.

== Future developments ==
There is a strong indication that the future will hold a place for technological, lifelike entities. These human-to-machine relationships may one day come to be methodically equivalent to relationships between living entities.

== See also ==
- Apophenia
- Mobile phone overuse
