= Einstein effect =

Due to Einstein's prolific output, the term Einstein effect may refer to any one of a large number of possible effects in different fields of physics.

These may include:

- Gravitational redshift
- Gravitational lensing

and more specifically,

- The Bose-Einstein effect
- The Einstein-de Haas effect

== See also ==
- List of things named after Albert Einstein
