= Ceiling effect =

Ceiling effect might refer to:

- Ceiling effect (pharmacology)
- Ceiling effect (statistics)

== See also ==
- Ceiling (disambiguation)
