= Lenard effect =

Lenard effect (also known as the balloelectric effect, spray electrification, or waterfall effect) is a physical phenomenon characterized by the separation of electric charges during the splashing and fragmentation of water drops. The phenomenon is named after the German physicist Philipp Lenard, who first experimentally investigated and described it in detail in 1892.

== Mechanism ==
When water strikes an obstacle or falls freely, the droplets break apart. During this fragmentation process, the finest water particles are torn away and acquire a negative electric charge, while the larger remaining droplets retain a positive charge.

Because the small, negatively charged droplets have higher mobility, they are easily carried away by air currents. This leads to the ionization of the surrounding atmosphere, enriching it with negative air ions.

== Occurrence in nature ==
Under natural conditions, the Lenard effect is most commonly observed in the following situations:

- Near large waterfalls and the rapids of turbulent mountain rivers.
- During heavy rain showers and thunderstorms.
- Near ocean surf, where waves break against rocks.
- Around artificial water fountains.

== See also ==
- Static electricity
- Atmospheric electricity
- Triboelectric effect
