= Sailing ship effect =

The sailing ship effect is a phenomenon by which the introduction of a new technology to a market accelerates the innovation of an incumbent technology. Despite the fact that the term was coined by W. H. Ward in 1967 the concept was made clear much earlier in a book by S. C. Gilfillan entitled Inventing the Ship, published in 1935. The name of the "effect" is a reference to advances made in sailing ships in the second half of the 1800s in response to the introduction of steamships. According to Ward, in the 50 years after the introduction of the steam ship, sailing ships made more improvements than they had in the previous 300 years. The term sailing ship effect applies to situations in which an old technology is revitalized, experiencing a "last gasp" when faced with the risk of being replaced by a newer technology. As Gilfillan put it, "It is paradoxical, but on examination logical, that this noble flowering of the sailing ship, this apotheosis during her decline and just before extermination, was partly vouchsafed by her supplanter, the steamer." (Gilfillan, 1935, p. 156).

This effect is the economic version of a phenomenon in biology called the Red Queen hypothesis. The sailing ship effect has attracted attention as a paradigm for the ecological transition of the energetic systems, especially in the automotive field.

== Causes ==
Three possible explanations have been suggested as the cause of the sailing ship effect:

- Old technologies improve in an attempt to avoid being replaced.
- Components of new technology "spill over", improving incumbent technologies.
- New technologies generate new notoriety for old technologies.

== Controversy ==
In 2005, the validity of the original example of the sailing ship effect was called into doubt. In a paper entitled "The Response of Old Technology Incumbents to Technological Competition: Does the Sailing Ship Effect Exist?", author John Howells contends that sailing ships and steamships serviced different market segments in the 1860s and 1870s and, therefore, were not directly competing technologies. Howells goes on to hypothesize that rapid advancements in sailing technology of that era may have arisen from competition between sailing ship firms. The paper goes on to call into doubt the prevalence of the phenomenon.

On the other hand, De Liso and Filatrella, while providing a review of the literature which confirms the existence of the sailing ship effect, provide a mathematical model which can simulate the sailing ship effect.

A recent paper by Sandro Mendonça argues that "The modernization of the sailing trader occurs before, not after, the steamship had become an effective competitor", and further cautions "if history is to be used to give credence to explanations of empirical regularities in a variety of settings in the original source of the relevant concepts must be carefully revisited and deeply researched".

== See also ==
- Network effect
- Penn effect
- Pigou effect
