= Shaft effect =

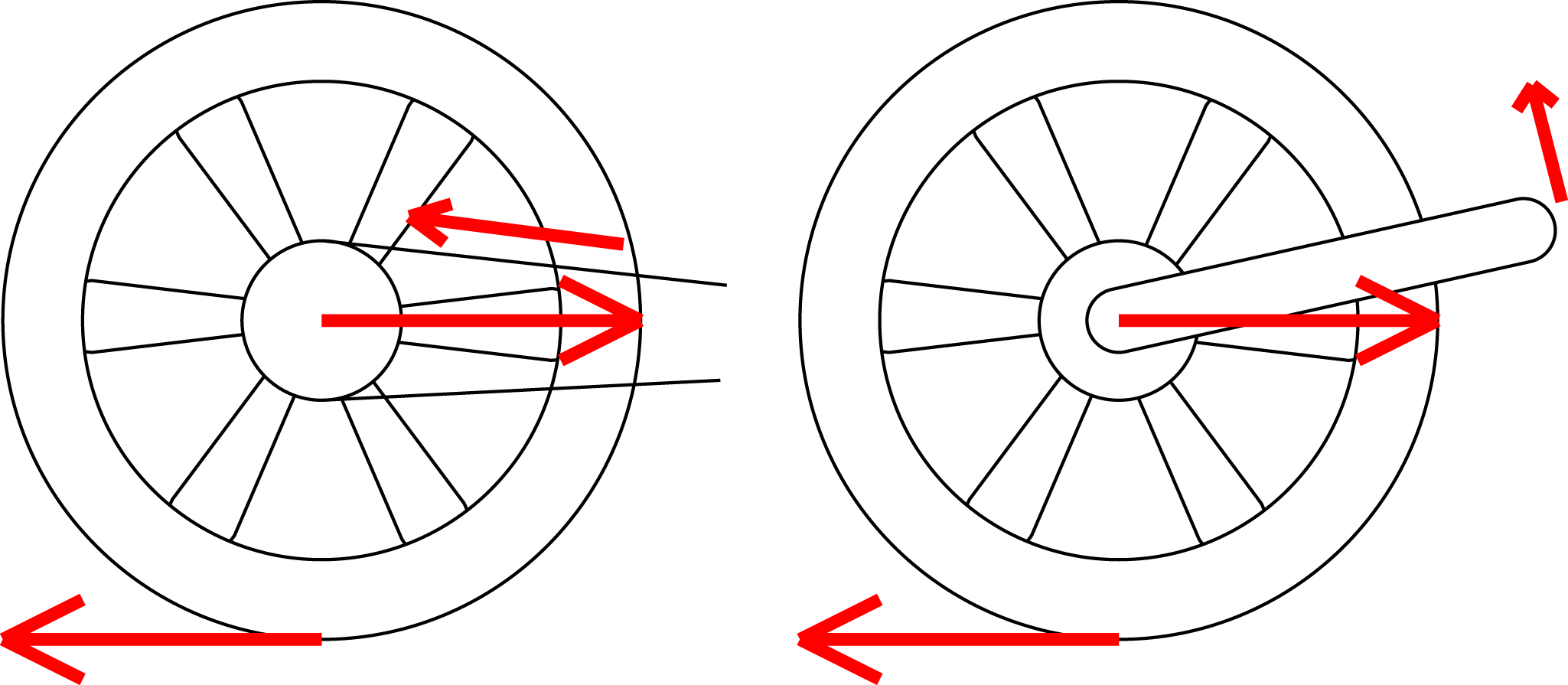
The forces involved in accelerating a motorcycle. Left: a chain or belt drive. Right: a shaft drive.

The shaft effect, also known as elevator effect or shaft jacking, is a phenomenon occurring in shaft-drive motorcycles. This effect occurs because the acceleration being applied to the rear wheel creates a reactive force on the drive shaft. This in turn lifts the rider and the body of the bike, exacerbating the natural "tucking under" of the rear wheel. Under acceleration Newton's third law says trying to turn the wheel forward exerts a reactionary force against the drive mechanism. In the case of a belt, this makes the top part of the belt tighten and the whole bike "shrug" down just a bit.

This is typically obscured because acceleration causes the rear wheel to "tuck under." A shaft-drive, on the other hand has a rigid connection to the hub so this reactionary force turns the shaft backwards about the rear wheel and the middle of the bike "tightens" and lifts the rider up. This effect is one of the most notable differences between riding a shaft-driven motorcycle and a typical motorcycle. The effect is most pronounced on older models of motorcycle as most modern shaft-driven bikes use one or two Paralevers to limit the rotation of the rear hub relative to the bike frame.

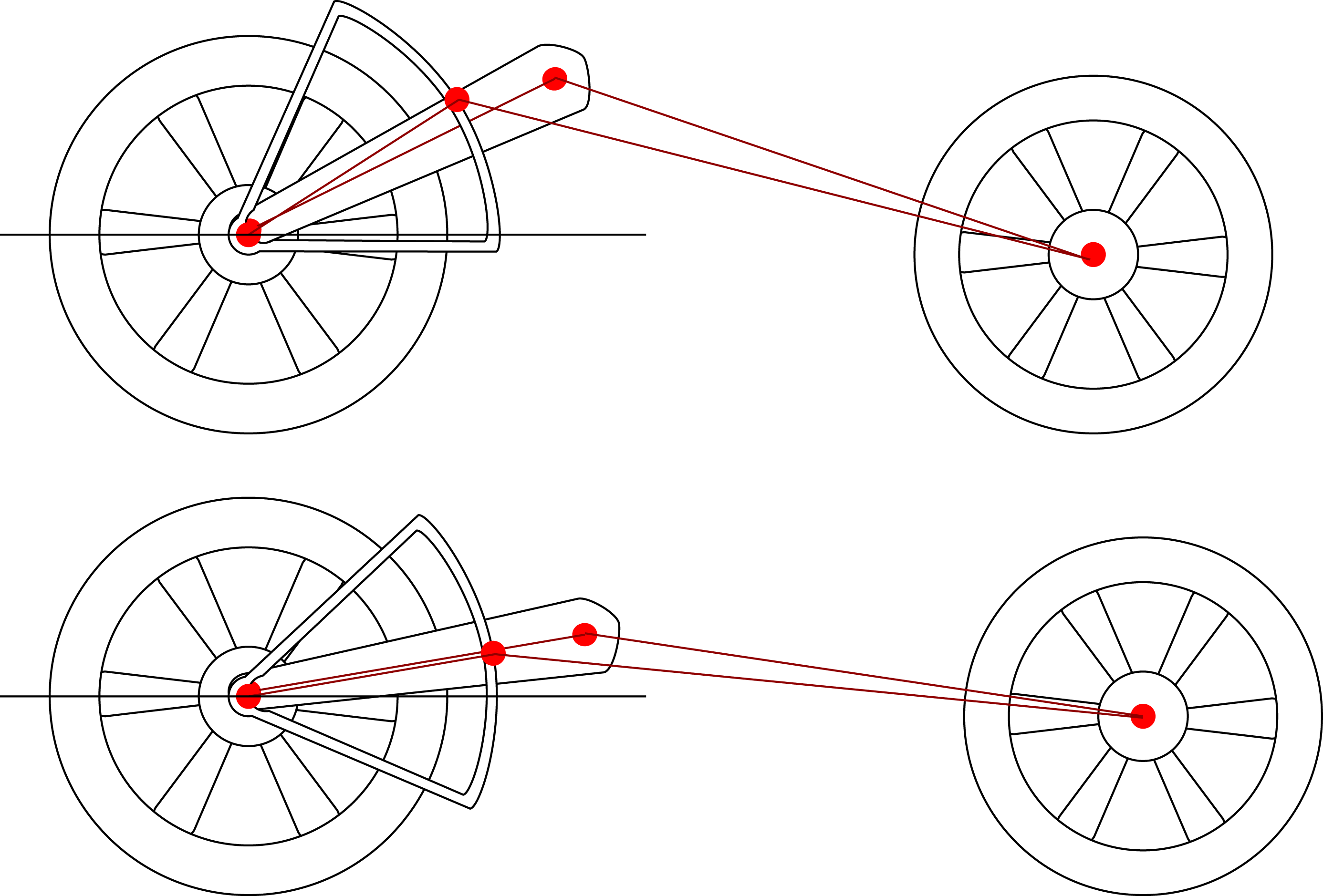
Depiction of the "Tucking Under" phenomenon and the relative effect on a softail versus a shaft drive. Top: Motorcycle under acceleration. Bottom: Motorcycle under braking.

== See also ==
- Bicycle and motorcycle dynamics
