= Disposal tax effect =

The situation of additional taxes or tax savings resulting from selling the last item of its class in an inventory due to the difference between its undepreciated capital cost (UCC) and its salvage value (SV).

== Overview ==
"Disposal tax effect" is a finance term originating from Engineering economics.

In the case of $SV > UCC$, then there has been a relative gain in the sale of the item, which gets taxed. These gains are known as "recaptured depreciation" or "recaptured CCA".

When $SV < UCC$, then there has been a loss, which results in tax savings.

The Central collection agency (CCA) uses a method of depreciation and the undepreciated value which is the undepreciated capital cost. As CCA uses a declining balance it makes the disposal of assets complicated. The disposal tax effect (DTE) takes into account that the salvage value can cause a gain or a loss.

The disposal tax effect formula: DTE = (BookValue – SalvageValue) x TR.

The relevant book value in this case is determining the tax gain or loss of the asset. The tax basis then is the difference between the original cost and any accumulated depreciation.

The disposal tax effect (DTE) is also calculated by getting the difference between the UCC cost and the salvage value and then multiplying it by the tax rate (TR).[1]

For businesses, the capital gain is from the appreciation value of the asset depending at which tax rate (TR) or tax law will be applied at the time of the sale. The recapture of depreciation is calculated by how much the company has over-depreciated the asset in its life. The recapture allocation is taxed at ordinary rates as excess depreciation over the years essentially reduced taxable income. The basis value is the price of the fixed asset.

Tax on recapture is calculated by = (BookValue – BasisValue) x TR Capital gains tax = (BasisValue – Salvage Value) x TR/2 Disposal tax effect (DTE) = (tax on recapture + Capital gains tax)

If a company sells an asset for less than the tax basis this causes a loss in capital. This means that the asset's value has decreased more than its depreciation value for tax. When capital loss occurs then a special tax rate is given. The benefit of this is that the sale of an asset is the amount by which the taxes are reduced (tax shield).

When there are capital gains and losses in the same year, the two values are then combined so that capital loss reduces and the taxes are paid on the capital gains.

In the case of an excess in capital losses, the remaining capital loss is used to reduce the ordinary capital income. The disposal tax effect (DTE) can be negative (when our salvage value is greater than our book value) which means that the tax effect increases taxes. Disposal tax effect (DTE) can also be negative if our asset is sold for a price greater than its purchase price but it is also equal to sum of the two tax effects.

If an asset has been fully depreciated (when the aggregate tax deductions are equal to the original cost of the asset) there are no additional tax implications placed on the asset.

=== Advantages ===
An advantage of having a loss from the sale of an asset is the amount of the reduction in taxes after. The reduction in taxable income is known as a tax shield. [2]

In Ireland at least 50% of the revenue which disposal tax brings into the government is poured back into biological treatment of bio-waste and mechanical-biological treatment of waste. This reduces the organic content of waste that goes into landfills or for incineration. This is highly beneficial for the environment.

While in Catalan it discourages landfills and incineration in accordance with and reinforcement of the European waste management it penalizes them economically.

Essentially the making of disposal can be more expensive but, on the other hand, it creates revenue for local authorities by diversified refunds for separate collection.

Disposal of new asset – If a company sells an asset for more than what it is worth then the gain is broken into two parts. Capital gain (sales price – original price) and recapture depreciation which is (original cost – tax basis). The benefit is the increased capital from the appreciation of the asset which will be taxed at a new special rate depending on the tax law at the time of sale.
