= Puget Sound Convergence Zone =

Meteorological phenomenon

The Puget Sound Convergence Zone (PSCZ) is a meteorological phenomenon that occurs over Puget Sound in the U.S. state of Washington. It is formed when the large-scale air flow splits around the Olympic Mountains and then converges over Puget Sound. This convergence zone generally occurs between north Seattle and Everett and can cause updrafts and convection, which leads to a narrow band of precipitation.

A second, weaker convergence zone can occur between approximately Victoria, British Columbia, and Bellingham, Washington, over the San Juan Islands, as a result of southwesterly air blowing from the Strait of Juan de Fuca meeting northerly air moving southward down the Strait of Georgia.

The National Weather Service publishes special reports, forecasts, and graphical analyses for the PSCZ region.

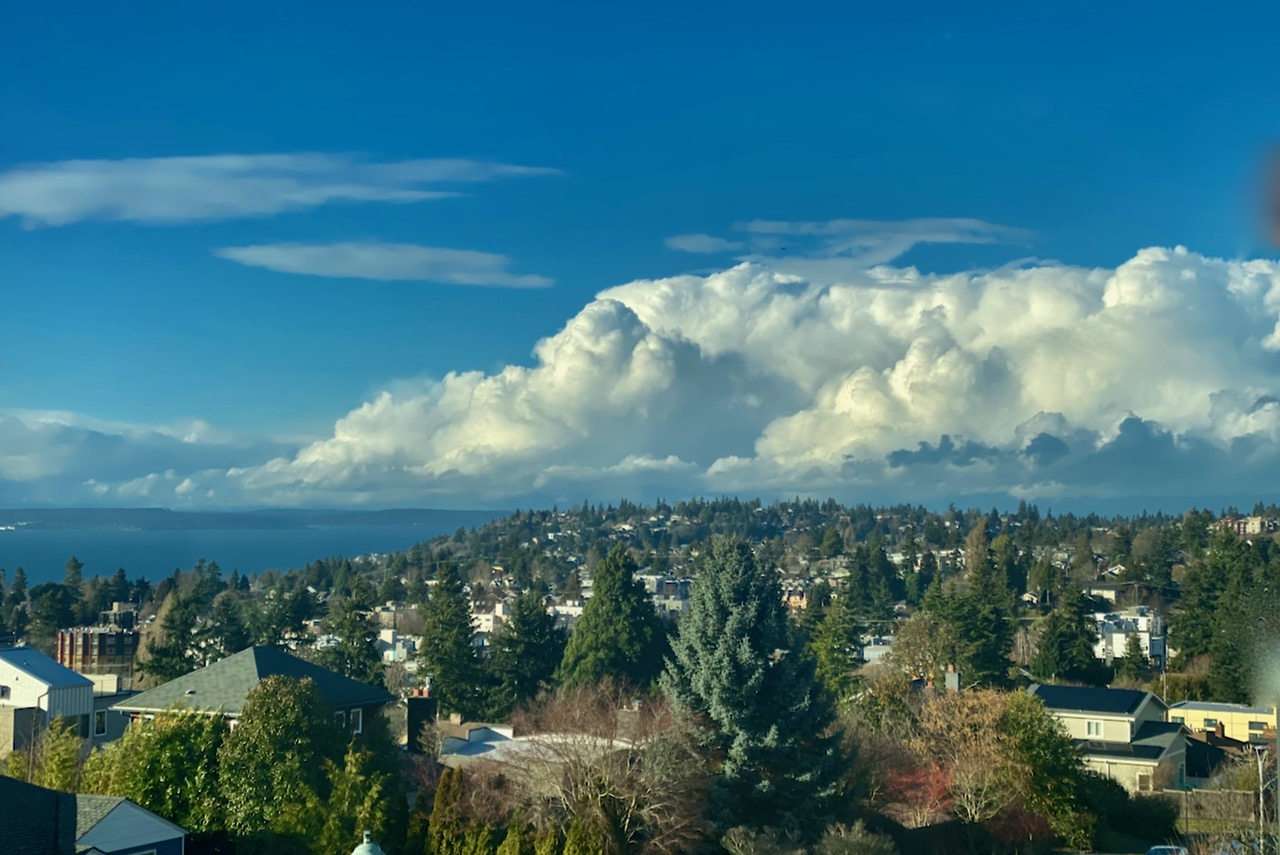
Convergence zone clouds in North Seattle

== Most common locations ==
Puget Sound Convergence Zones, variable in both location and strength, tend to form in the general vicinity of central and southern Snohomish and northern King counties in Washington, from Everett to the Northgate neighborhood of Seattle. The strongest part of the Convergence Zone (where the heaviest precipitation falls) tends to lie along and adjacent to the King-Snohomish County line so that neither county is left dry. The proximity of the Convergence Zone to the King-Snohomish County line is the reason that cities located just north or south of the line, which are located within the rain shadow of the Olympic Mountains, approach Seattle in annual precipitation. The effect of the Puget Sound Convergence Zone nearly offsets that of the rain shadow. Without PSCZ, cities such as Edmonds, Mountlake Terrace, and Lynnwood in Snohomish County and Shoreline, Lake Forest Park, and Bothell in King County would be noticeably drier than Seattle.

The PSCZ has been suggested as the cause of greater precipitation over Glacier Peak relative to other mountains in the Cascades to the east of Puget Sound. As there are no weather stations near Glacier Peak, it remains unclear whether that area actually receives greater precipitation than elsewhere in the Cascade Range.

== Events ==
=== April 18, 2008 ===
On April 18, 2008, a strong and very unseasonable snow-producing Puget Sound Convergence Zone storm formed around Everett, and spread south throughout the course of the afternoon and evening. By evening, the Zone had spread into northern King County, dumping 3.5 inches (89 mm) of snow in Shoreline, and 6.5 inches (170 mm) of snow in Woodinville. As the Zone slowly sank south of Shoreline into Seattle (past NE 145th Street), snow amounts began to taper off. The snow-producing part of the Zone ended abruptly at Roosevelt High School, a mere ten blocks north of the beginnings of the University District and the University of Washington community. Just north of Roosevelt High School, an inch of snow coated the ground, and due west of the school in the Green Lake neighborhood of Seattle, an inch of snow had also fallen. In line with the known "abrupt edge" of the Puget Sound Convergence Zone, areas to the south of this Green Lake-to-Roosevelt High line (marked by NE 68th Street), including the U-District, witnessed only a dusting of snow.

=== Port Orchard tornado ===
On December 18, 2018, a tornado formed in Port Orchard, Washington during an atmospheric river event that lasted for several weeks. The tornado was rated EF2 with winds near 125 miles per hour (201 km/h) and caused approximately $1.8 million (2018 USD) of damage and was the strongest tornado in the state since the 1980s.
