= Glass house effect =

Awareness that one is subject to ubiquitous surveillance

The Glass House Effect (or GHE) is the resulting phenomenon brought on by an awareness that one is subject to ubiquitous surveillance. In corporate environments, the transparency is considered a good idea, as it is believed this discourages corporate crime and other misfeasance.

The Glass House Effect can cause a sense of pessimism in persons who are subjected to such unrestrained monitoring. In such circumstances, solitude is conspicuously absent, and privacy is considered a thoughtcrime. The messages conveyed to the subject in such an environment usually involve some variation on the notion of Catch-22, such as:

1. There is no place to hide; nor should you want to.
2. Any exhibited avoidance behavior is considered a threat, and an invitation for additional scrutiny.
