= Visual effects art director =

In the context of film and television production, a visual effects art director is responsible for conceptualizing and designing visual effects shots. They are charged with making creative and aesthetic choices for visual effects. Although the role is generally more creative in nature, most directors have a technical background.

== See also ==
- Television crew
