= Ștefan Procopiu =

Romanian physicist

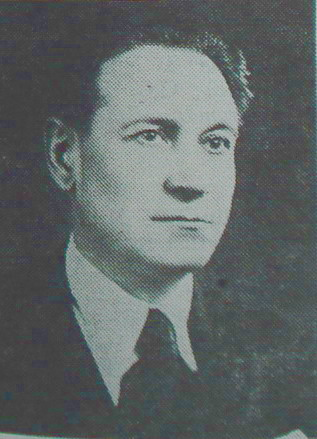
- Ștefan Procopiu
- Born: 19 January 1890; Bârlad, Kingdom of Romania
- Died: 22 August 1972 (aged 82); Iași, Socialist Republic of Romania
- Resting place: Eternitatea Cemetery, Iași
- Citizenship: Romanian
- Education: Gheorghe Roșca Codreanu High School
- Alma mater: University of Iași; University of Paris
- Known for: Bohr–Procopiu magneton Procopiu effect Procopiu phenomenon
- Awards: Order of the Star of Romania; Romanian State Prize (1964)
- Scientific career
- Fields: Physics
- Workplaces: University of Iași; Gheorghe Asachi Polytechnic Institute of Iași
- Thesis: On the electric birefringence of suspensions (1924)
- Doctoral advisor: Aimé Cotton

Ștefan Procopiu (Romanian pronunciation: [ʃteˈfan prokoˈpi.u]; 19 January 1890 – 22 August 1972) was a Romanian physicist and a titular member of the Romanian Academy.

== Biography ==
Procopiu was born in 1890 in Bârlad, Romania. His father, Emanoil Procopiu, was employed at the Bârlad courthouse. His mother, Ecaterina Tașcă, was the sister of Gheorghe Tașcă (see Tașcă family). He attended the Gheorghe Roșca Codreanu High School in Bârlad from 1901 to 1908, continuing his studies at the Faculty of Sciences of the University of Iași from 1908 to 1912. After graduation he became assistant to Professor Dragomir Hurmuzescu.

In 1919 he obtained a scholarship to continue his studies at the University of Paris, attending courses of famous scientists, such as Gabriel Lippmann, Marie Curie, Paul Langevin, and Aimé Cotton. On 5 March 1924, Procopiu obtained the title of doctor in physics with the thesis "On the electric birefringence of suspensions" presented to a commission including professor Aimé Cotton as coordinator and Charles Fabry and Henri Mouton as cross-examiners.

After his return to Romania on 15 January 1925, professor of the gravitation, heat and electricity department of the University of Iași, replacing his former teacher Dragomir Hurmuzescu, who had retired., Procopiu coordinated the department until his retirement in 1962. At the same time he was appointed professor at the Gheorghe Asachi Polytechnic Institute of Iași In 1939 Ștefan Procopiu published his treatise on "Electricity and Magnetism", followed in 1948 by his monography on “Thermodynamics”.

In June 1948 he was appointed corresponding member of the Romanian Academy, being promoted to full membership on 2 July 1955. In 1964 he was awarded the Romanian State Prize. He was also decorated with the Order of Work (Ordinul Muncii), Order of the Star of Romania, and the Order of Scientific Merit. Procopiu was also selected twice as member in the Commission for the award of the Nobel Prize.

Procopiu was also deeply involved in the cultural life of the city of Iași. He was an active member of the board of directors of the Vasile Alecsandri National Theatre.

He died on 22 August 1972, in Iași, at the age of 82 and was buried in the city's Eternitatea Cemetery.

== Scientific activity ==
Ștefan Procopiu started scientific research even before graduating. He continued this activity while he was assistant professor.

=== The magnetic moment of the electron ===
The first important paper by Ștefan Procopiu is "Determining the Molecular Magnetic Moment by M. Planck’s Quantum Theory". After studying Planck’s quantum theory and Langevin’s magnetism theory, he established the magnetic moment of the electron and determined the physical constant of magnetic moment, named magneton. Ștefan Procopiu published his results two years before Niels Bohr made the same discovery independently.

Continuing his studies, in 1954 he established a method for the experimental determination of the magneton, which he improved in 1963.

=== Other research before and during World War I ===
Ștefan Procopiu also worked on wireless communications and in 1913 published a paper on “Experimental Research on Wireless Telegraphy”. In 1916 he invented a device for locating and establishing the depth of bullets in the bodies of wounded soldiers.

=== Longitudinal depolarization of light ===
In 1921, Procopiu discovered and analyzed in the Physics Laboratory of Sorbonne University a new optical phenomenon which consisted in the longitudinal depolarization of light by suspensions and colloids. In 1930, the occurrence was designated as "Procopiu Phenomenon" by Augustin Boutaric. Part of this research was included in Procopiu's doctoral thesis.

=== Electromotive force of galvanic elements ===
Thus, in 1930, studying the Barkhausen effect, Ștefan Procopiu discovered a circular effect of magnetic discontinuity. In 1951, this effect was named Procopiu Effect. This discovery had important applications in the development of the memory of computers.

=== Studies of the Earth's magnetic field ===
Earth’s magnetism was a continuous concern of Ștefan Procopiu, For 25 years he studied this phenomenon in Romania and developed the magnetic maps of the country. He also identified the magnetic anomaly located on the Iași-Botoșani railway line.

In 1947, Procopiu identified a variation of the Earth's magnetic field, with a periodicity of approximately 500 years, indicating that, starting 1932, Earth's magnetic moment increases from the equator to the poles.

=== Main works ===
- Library of Congress
