= Zonnemaire =

- Village
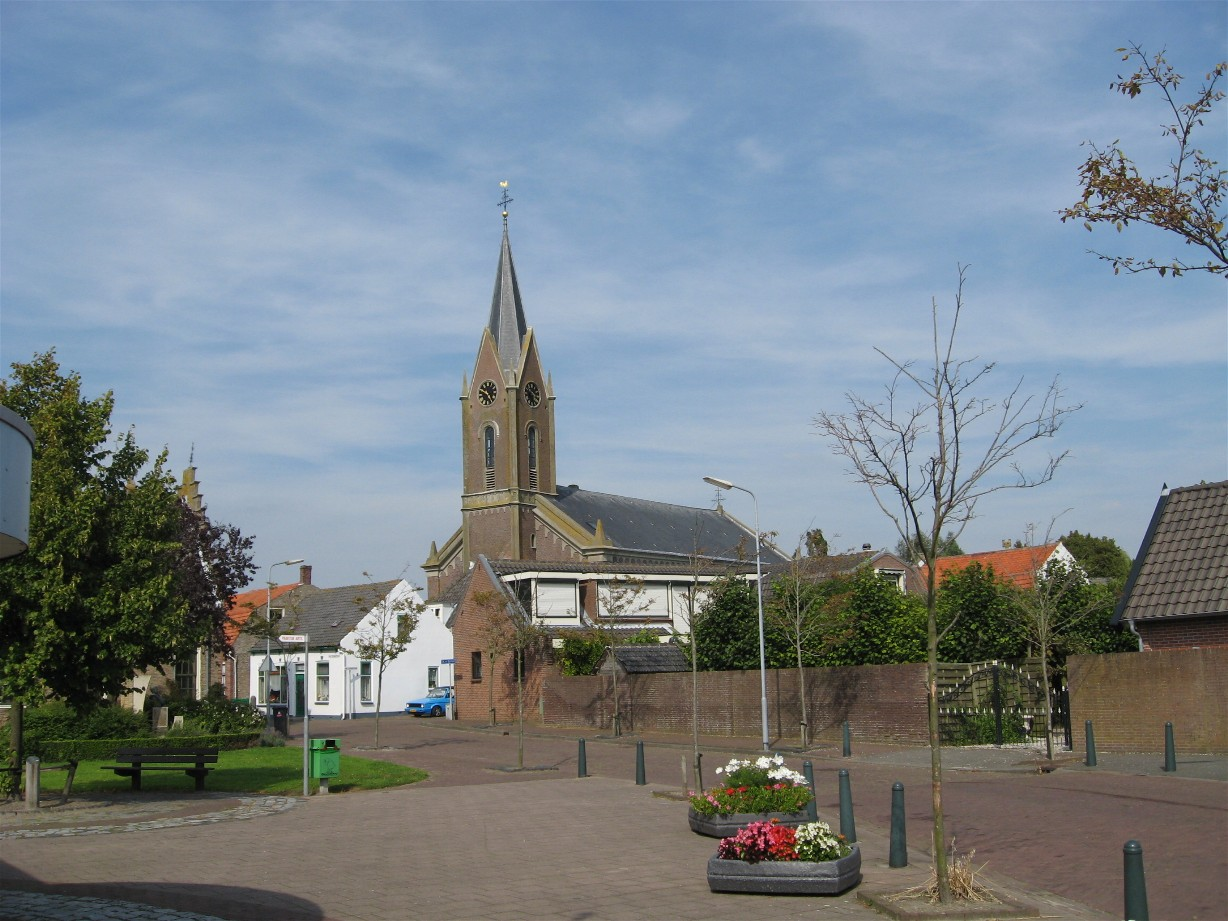
- Hervormde kerk

- Coat of arms

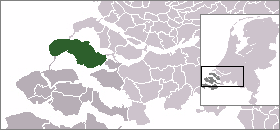

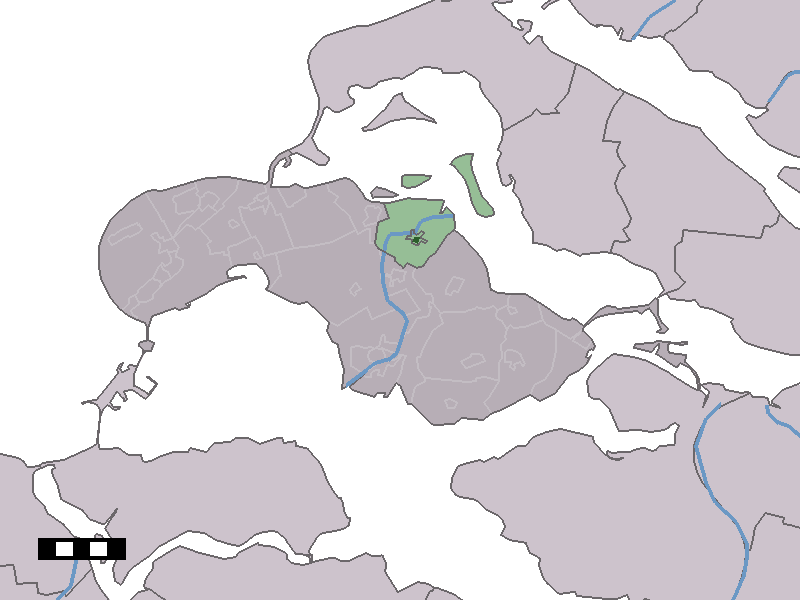
- The village centre (dark green) and the statistical district (light green) of Zonnemaire in the municipality of Schouwen-Duiveland

- Location in the province of Zeeland in the Netherlands Zonnemaire (Netherlands)
- Coordinates: 51°42′45″N 3°57′3″E
- Country: Netherlands
- Province: Zeeland
- Municipality: Schouwen-Duiveland

Area
  - Total: 17.69 km^{2} (6.83 sq mi)
- Elevation: 0.7 m (2.3 ft)

Population (2021)
  - Total: 755
  - Density: 42.7/km^{2} (111/sq mi)
- Time zone: UTC+1 (CET)
  - Summer (DST): UTC+2 (CEST)
- Postal code: 4316
- Dialing code: 0111

Zonnemaire is a village in the municipality of Schouwen-Duiveland in the Dutch province of Zeeland. It lies about 19 kilometres (12 mi) southwest of Hellevoetsluis. In 2021, Zonnemaire had a population of 755.

== History ==
Zonnemaire was named after Sonnemare, the water between the former islands of Bommenede and Schouwen. Zonnemarie is a road village which was first mentioned in 985 when it became owned by the Count of Holland. The current village developed after the Zonnemairepolder which was reclaimed in 1401.

The Dutch Reformed church is an aisleless church with a partially built-in tower. It was constructed in 1867 as a replacement of its 15th-century predecessor. The grist mill De Korenbloem was built in 1872 and was in service until 1961. It was extensively restored between 1991 and 1992; it operates on a voluntary basis.

Zonnemaire was home to 442 people in 1840. It was a separate municipality until 1961, when it was merged with Brouwershaven. In 1997, it became part of the municipality of Schouwen-Duiveland.

== Notable people ==
Zonnemaire is the birthplace of Pieter Zeeman, who shared the 1902 Nobel Prize in Physics with Hendrik Lorentz for his discovery of the Zeeman effect.

== Gallery ==
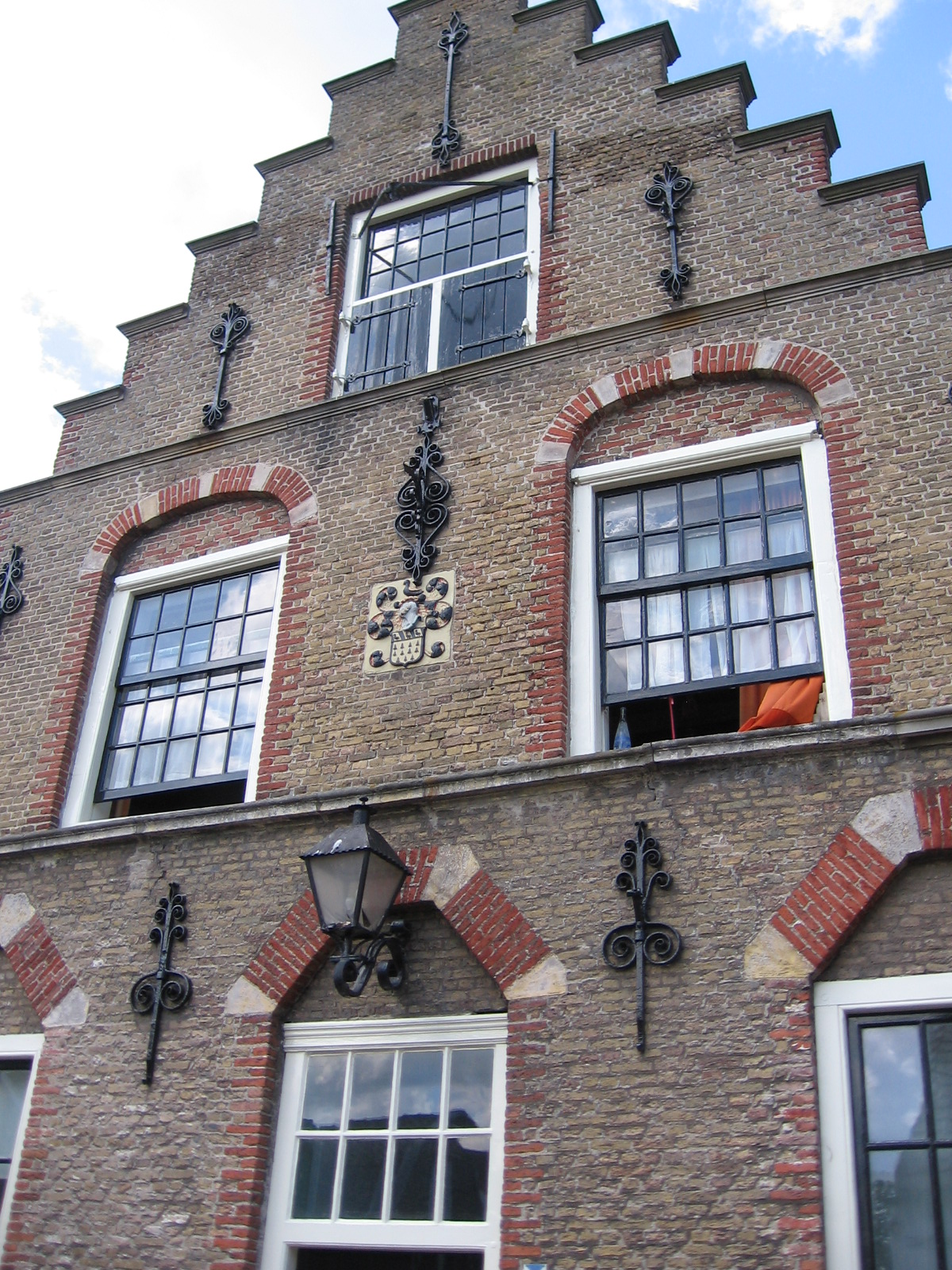
Birth house of Pieter Zeeman

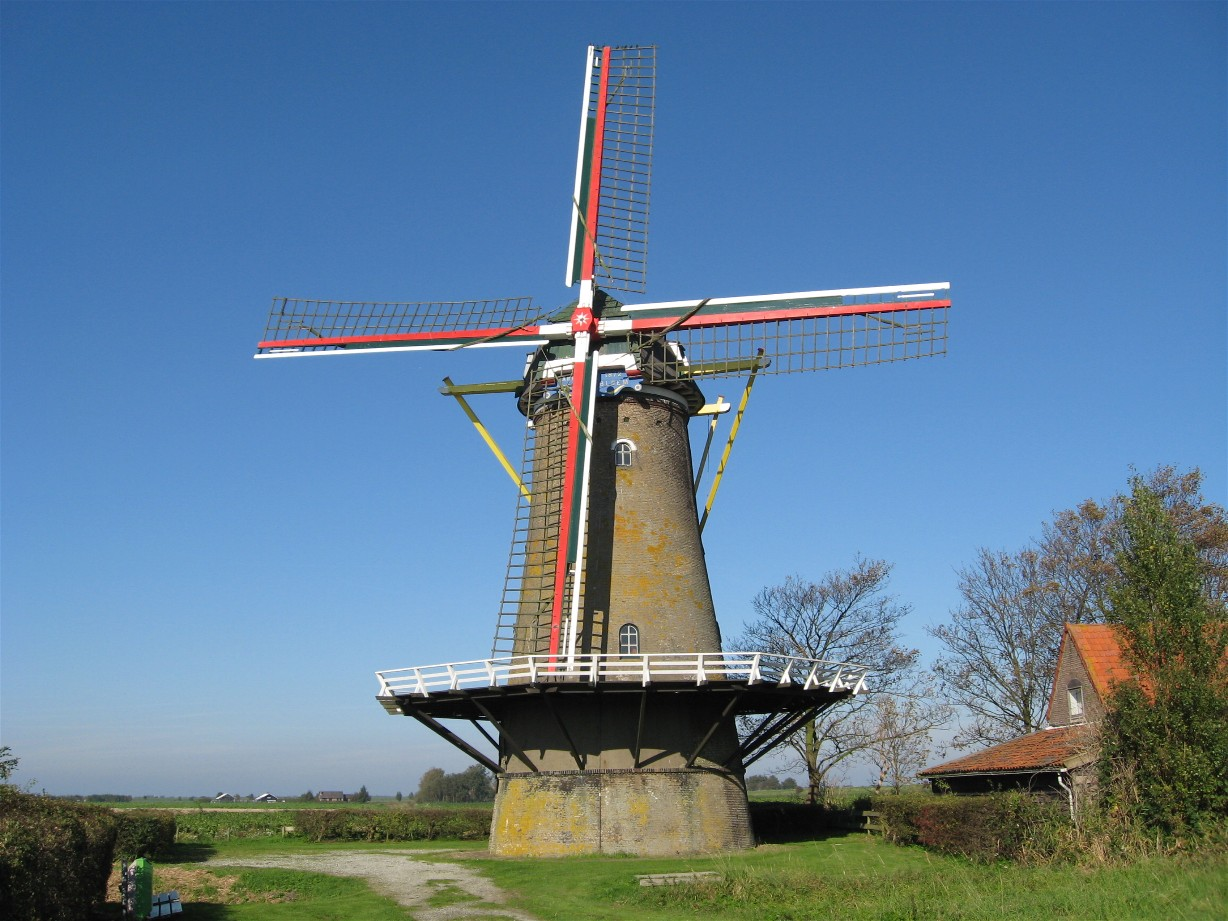
Wind mill De Korenbloem

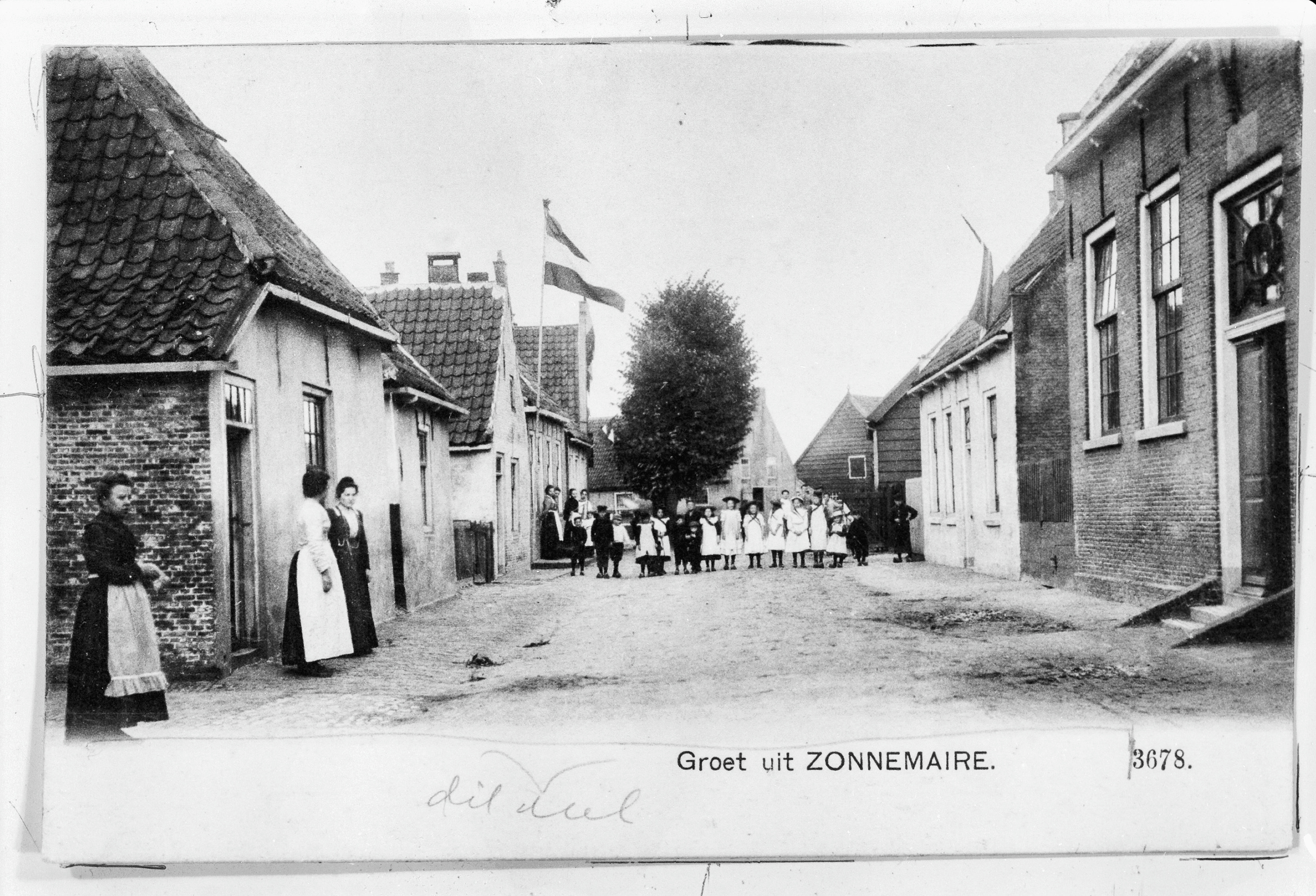
Postcard (1900)

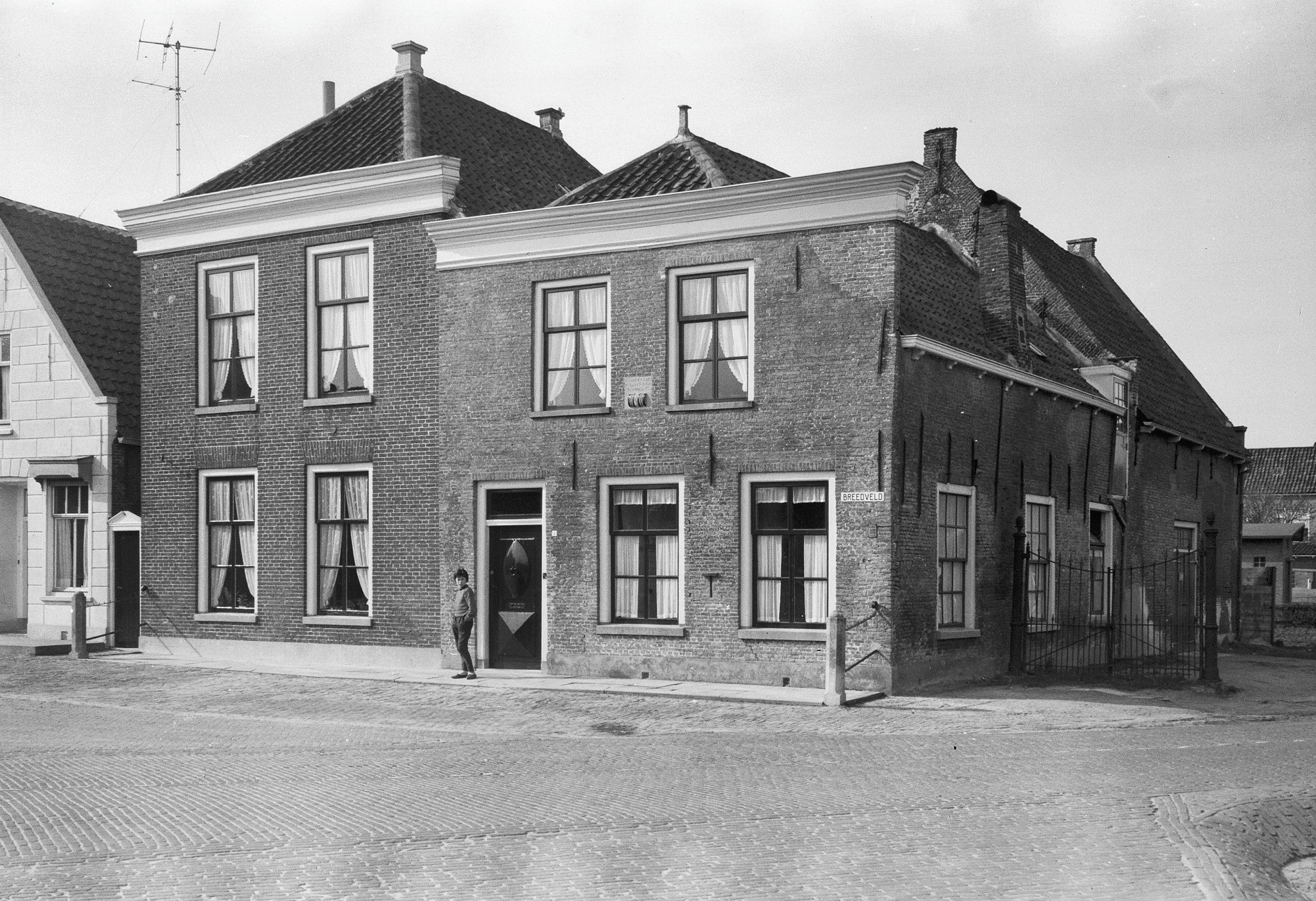
Houses in Zonnemarie
