= Zeeman energy =

Potential energy of a magnetised body in an external magnetic field

Zeeman energy, or the external field energy, is the potential energy of a magnetised body in an external magnetic field. It is named after the Dutch physicist Pieter Zeeman, primarily known for the Zeeman effect. In SI units, it is given by

$$E_{\rm Zeeman} =-\mu_{0} \int_V\,\textbf M\cdot \textbf H_{\rm Ext} \, \mathrm dV$$

where H_{Ext} is the external field, M the local magnetisation, and the integral is done over the volume of the body. This is the statistical average (over a unit volume macroscopic sample) of a corresponding microscopic Hamiltonian (energy) for each individual magnetic moment m, which is however experiencing a local induction B:

$$H =-\textbf m \cdot \textbf B$$
