= Voigt effect =

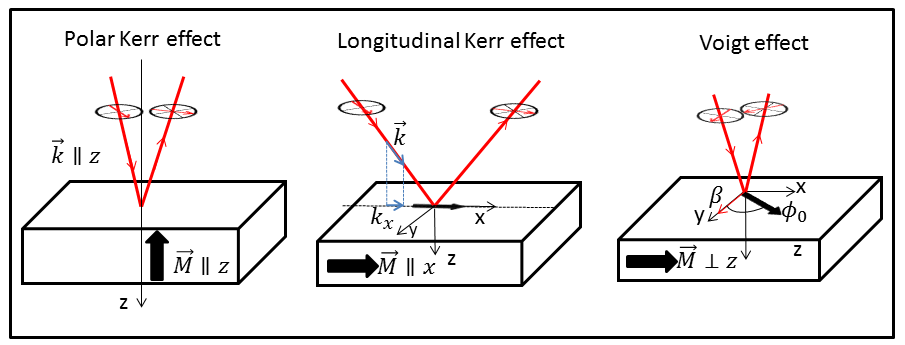
Schematic of the polar Kerr effect, longitudinal Kerr effect and the Voigt effect

The Voigt effect is a magneto-optical phenomenon which rotates and elliptizes linearly polarised light sent into an optically active medium. The effect is named after the German scientist Woldemar Voigt who discovered it in vapors. Unlike many other magneto-optical effects such as the Kerr or Faraday effect which are linearly proportional to the magnetization (or to the applied magnetic field for a non magnetized material), the Voigt effect is proportional to the square of the magnetization (or square of the magnetic field) and can be seen experimentally at normal incidence. There are also other denominations for this effect, used interchangeably in the modern scientific literature: the Cotton–Mouton effect (in reference to French scientists Aimé Cotton and Henri Mouton who discovered the same effect in liquids a few years later) and magnetic-linear birefringence, with the latter reflecting the physical meaning of the effect.

For an electromagnetic incident wave linearly polarized $\vec{E_i} = ( \cos \beta ,\, \sin \beta ,\, 0 ) e^{-i \omega (t-n_1 z /c)}$ and an in-plane polarized sample $\vec{m} = ( \cos \phi ,\, \sin \phi ,\, 0 )$, the expression of the rotation in reflection geometry is $\delta \beta$ is:
$$\delta \beta_r = \frac{2 \Delta n}{n_0^2-1}\sin[2(\phi-\beta)]$$
and in the transmission geometry:
$$\delta \beta_t = \frac{B_1 + n_0^2 \Big[\frac{2L\omega}{c}(1+n_0) Q_i Q_r + Q_r^2-Q_i^2\Big]}{n_0 (1+n_0)},$$
where $\Delta n = \frac{{n_{\parallel} - n_{\perp}}}{2}$ is the difference of refraction indices depending on the Voigt parameter $Q = Q_i + i Q_r$ (same as for the Kerr effect), $n_0$ the material refraction indices and $B_1$ the parameter responsible of the Voigt effect and so proportional to the $M^2$ or $(\mu_0 H)^2$ in the case of a paramagnetic material.

Detailed calculation and an illustration are given in sections below.

== Theory ==
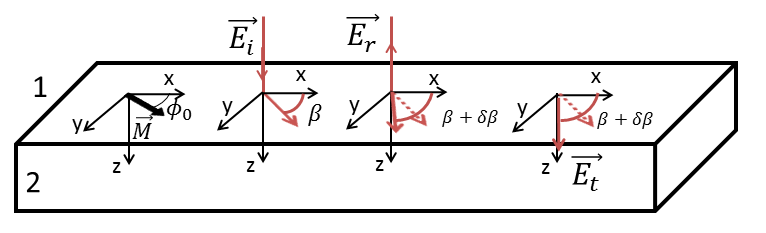
Framework and coordinate system for the derivation of Voigt effect. $\vec{E}_i$, $\vec{E}_r$ and $\vec{E}_t$ are referring to the incident, reflected and transmitted electromagnetic field.

As with the other magneto-optical effects, the theory is developed in a standard way with the use of an effective dielectric tensor from which one calculates systems eigenvalues and eigenvectors. As usual, from this tensor, magneto-optical phenomena are described mainly by the off-diagonal elements.

Here, one considers an incident polarisation propagating in the z direction: $\vec{E_i} = ( \cos \beta ,\, \sin \beta ,\, 0 ) e^{-i \omega (t-n_1 z /c)}$ the electric field and a homogenously in-plane magnetized sample $\vec{m} = ( \cos \phi ,\, \sin \phi ,\, 0 )$ where $\phi$ is counted from the [100] crystallographic direction. The aim is to calculate $\vec{E_r} = ( \cos \beta+\delta \beta ,\, \sin \beta+\delta \beta ,\, 0 ) e^{-i \omega (t+n_1 z /c)}$ where $\delta \beta$ is the rotation of polarization due to the coupling of the light with the magnetization. Let us notice that $\delta \beta$ is experimentally a small quantity of the order of mrad. $\vec{m}$ is the reduced magnetization vector defined by $\vec{m} = \vec{M}/M_s$ , $M_s$ the magnetization at saturation. We emphasized with the fact that it is because the light propagation vector is perpendicular to the magnetization plane that it is possible to see the Voigt effect.

=== Dielectric tensor ===
Following the notation of Hubert, the generalized dielectric cubic tensor $\varepsilon_r$ take the following form:
$$(1) \qquad \varepsilon_r = \epsilon
\begin{bmatrix}
1 & 0 & i Q m_y \\
0 & 1 & -i Q m_x \\
-i Q m_y & i Q m_x & 1
\end{bmatrix}
+
\begin{bmatrix}
B_1 m_x^2 & B_2 m_x m_y & 0 \\
B_2 m_x m_y & B_1 m_y^2 & 0\\
0 & 0 & B_1 m_z^2
\end{bmatrix}$$
where $\varepsilon$ is the material dielectric constant, $Q$ the Voigt parameter, $B_1$ and $B_2$ two cubic constants describing magneto-optical effect depending on $m_i^2$. $m_i$ is the reduce $m_i = M_i/M_s$. Calculation is made in the spherical approximation with $B_1 = B_2$. At the present moment, there is no evidence that this approximation is not valid, as the observation of Voigt effect is rare because it is extremely small with respect to the Kerr effect.

=== Eigenvalues and eigenvectors ===
To calculate the eigenvalues and eigenvectors, we consider the propagation equation derived from the Maxwell equations, with the convention $\vec{n} = \vec{k} c / \omega$:
$$(2) \qquad n^2 \vec{E} - \vec{n}(\vec{n}\cdot\vec{E}) = \varepsilon \vec{E}$$

When the magnetization is perpendicular to the propagation wavevector, on the contrary to the Kerr effect, $\vec{E}$ may have all his three components equals to zero making calculations rather more complicated and making Fresnels equations no longer valid. A way to simplify the problem consists to use the electric field displacement vector $\vec{D} = \varepsilon \vec{E}$ . Since $\vec{\nabla} \cdot \vec{D} = 0$ and $\vec{k}\parallel \vec{z}$ we have $\vec{D} = ( D_x , D_y , 0 )$. The inverse dielectric tensor can seem complicated to handle, but here the calculation was made for the general case. One can follow easily the demonstration by considering $\phi = 0$.

Eigenvalues and eigenvectors are found by solving the propagation equation on $\vec{D}$ which gives the following system of equation:
$$(3)\quad \begin{cases} (\varepsilon_{xx}^{-1}-\frac{1}{n^2}) D_x + \epsilon_{xy}^{-1} D_y = 0 \\
\\
\varepsilon_{yx}^{-1} D_x + (\varepsilon_{yy}^{-1} - \frac{1}{n^2}) D_y = 0
\end{cases}$$
where $\varepsilon_{ij}^{-1}$ represents the inverse $ij$ element of the dielectric tensor $\varepsilon_r$, and $n^2 = \varepsilon$. After a straightforward calculation of the system's determinant, one has to make a development on 2nd order in $Q$ and first order of $B_1$. This led to the two eigenvalues corresponding the two refraction indices:
$$n_{\parallel}^2 = \varepsilon+B_1$$
$$n_{\perp}^2 = \varepsilon(1-Q^2)$$

The corresponding eigenvectors for $\vec{D}$ and for $\vec{E}$ are:

$$(4) \qquad \vec{D}_{\parallel}=
\begin{pmatrix}
\cos(\phi)\\
\sin(\phi)\\
0
\end{pmatrix} \qquad
\vec{D}_{\perp}=
\begin{pmatrix}
-\sin(\phi)\\
\cos(\phi)\\
0
\end{pmatrix} \qquad
\vec{E}_{\parallel}= \varepsilon^{-1} \vec{D}_{\parallel}=
\begin{pmatrix}
\frac{\cos(\phi)}{B_1+\varepsilon}\\
\frac{\sin(\phi)}{B_1+\epsilon}\\
0
\end{pmatrix} \qquad
\vec{E}_{\perp}= \varepsilon^{-1} \vec{D}_{\perp}=
\begin{pmatrix}
\frac{\sin(\phi)}{(Q^{2}-1)\epsilon}\\
\frac{\cos(\phi)}{(1-Q^{2})\epsilon}\\
\frac{-i Q}{(1-Q^{2})\epsilon}
\end{pmatrix}$$

=== Reflection geometry ===
==== Continuity relation ====
Knowing the eigenvectors and eigenvalues inside the material, one have to calculate $\vec{E_r} = ( E_{rx} , E_{ry} , 0 )$ the reflected electromagnetic vector usually detected in experiments. We use the continuity equations for $\vec{E}$ and $\vec{H}$ where $\vec{H}$ is the induction defined from Maxwell's equations by $\vec{\nabla} \times \vec{H} = \frac{1}{c} \frac{\partial \vec{D}}{\partial t}$. Inside the medium, the electromagnetic field is decomposed on the derived eigenvectors $\vec{E}_t = \alpha \vec{E}_{\parallel} + \beta \vec{E}_{\perp}$. The system of equation to solve is:
$$(5)\quad \begin{cases}
\alpha \Big(\frac{D_{y\parallel}}{n_{\parallel}}\Big)+\beta \Big(\frac{D_{y\perp}}{n_{\perp}}\Big) + E_{ry} = E_{0y}\\ \\
\alpha \Big(\frac{D_{x\parallel}}{n_{\parallel}}\Big) +\beta \Big(\frac{D_{x\perp}}{n_{\perp}}\Big) + E_{rx} = E_{0x}\\ \\
\alpha E_{x\parallel}+\beta E_{x\perp}-E_{rx} = E_{0x} \\ \\
\alpha E_{y\parallel}+\beta E_{y\perp}-E_{ry} = E_{0y}
\end{cases}$$

The solution of this system of equation are:
$$(6) \quad E_{rx} = E_0 \frac{(1-n_{\perp}n_{\parallel}) \cos(\beta) + (n_{\perp}-n_{\parallel}) \cos(\beta-2\phi)}{(1+n_{\parallel})(1+n_{\perp})}$$
$$(7) \quad E_{ry} = E_0 \frac{(1-n_{\perp}n_{\parallel}) \sin(\beta) - (n_{\perp}-n_{\parallel}) \sin(\beta-2\phi)}{(1+n_{\parallel})(1+n_{\perp})}$$

==== Calculation of rotation angle ====
The rotation angle $\delta \beta$ and the ellipticity angle $\psi$ are defined from the ratio $\chi = E_{ry}/E_{rx}$ with the two following formulae:
$$(8) \quad \tan 2 \delta \beta = \frac{2 \operatorname{Re}(\chi)}{1-|\chi| ^2} \qquad (9) \quad \sin(2 \psi_K) = \frac{2 \operatorname{Im}(\chi)}{1-|\chi |^2},$$
where $\operatorname{Re}(\chi)$ and $\operatorname{Im}(\chi)$ represent the real and imaginary part of $\chi$. Using the two previously calculated components, one obtains:
$$(10) \qquad \chi =\frac{(B_1+n_0^2 Q^{2})}{2 n_0(n_0^2-1)}\frac{\sin[2(\phi-\beta)]}{\cos(\beta)^2}+\tan(\beta).$$
This gives for the Voigt rotation:
$$(11) \qquad \delta \beta = \operatorname{Re}\left[\frac{B_1+n_0^2 Q^{2}}{2 n_0 (n_0^2-1)}\right] \sin[2(\phi-\beta)],$$
which can also be rewritten in the case of $B_1$, $n_0$, and $Q$ real:
$$(12) \quad \delta \beta = \frac{2 \Delta n}{n_0^2-1}\sin[2(\phi-\beta)],$$
where $\Delta n = \frac{{n_{\parallel} - n_{\perp}}}{2}$ is the difference of refraction indices. Consequently, one obtains something proportional to $\Delta n$ and which depends on the incident linear polarisation. For proper $\phi-\beta$ no Voigt rotation can be observed. $\Delta n$ is proportional to the square of the magnetization since $B_1 \propto M_s^2$ and $Q \propto M_s$.

=== Transmission geometry ===
The calculation of the rotation of the Voigt effect in transmission is in principle equivalent to that of the Faraday effect. In practice, this configuration is not used in general for ferromagnetic samples since the absorption length is weak in this kind of material. However, the use of transmission geometry is more common for paramagnetic liquid or cristal where the light can travel easily inside the material.

The calculation for a paramagnetic material is exactly the same with respect to a ferromagnetic one, except that the magnetization is replaced by a field $\mu_0 \vec{H}= \mu_0 H_0 ( \cos \phi ,\, \sin \phi )$ ($H_0$ in $\mathrm{A/m}$ or $\mathrm{G}$). For convenience, the field will be added at the end of calculation in the magneto-optical parameters.

Consider the transmitted electromagnetic waves $\vec{E}_t$ propagating in a medium of length L. From equation (5), one obtains for $\alpha$ and $\beta$:
$$\alpha = \frac{2 E_0 n_{\parallel} \cos (\theta-\phi)}{1+n_{\parallel}}$$
$$\beta = \frac{2 E_0 n_{\perp}^2 \sin(\theta-\phi)}{n_{\perp}+1}$$
At the position z = L, the expression of $\vec{E}_t$ is:
$$(13)\quad \vec{E}_{t}= e^{-i \omega [t+\frac{(n_{\parallel}+n_{\perp}) L}{2 c}]} \Big[\alpha \vec{E}_{\parallel} e^{i \frac{\omega \Delta n L}{c}}+ \beta \vec{E}_{\perp} e^{-i \frac{\omega \Delta n L}{c}}\Big]$$
where $\vec{E}_{\parallel}$ and $\vec{E}_{\perp}$are the eigenvectors previously calculated, and $\Delta n = \frac{n_{\parallel}-n_{\perp}}{2}$ is the difference for the two refraction indices. The rotation is then calculated from the ratio $\chi = \frac{E_{t_y}}{E_{t_x}}$, with development in first order in $B_1$ and second order in $Q$. This gives:
$$(14) \quad \chi = \frac{c-i~\omega L(1+n_0)(B_1+n_0 Q^2) \sin[2(\beta-\phi)]}{4 c n_0 (1+n_0) \cos^2(\beta)} = \frac{c-i~\omega L(1+n_0)\Delta n \sin[2(\beta-\phi)]}{ c~(1+n_0) \cos^2(\beta)}$$

Again we obtain something proportional to $\Delta n$ and $L$, the light propagation length. Let us notice that $\Delta n$ is proportional to $(\mu_0 H_0)^2$ in the same way with respect to the geometry in reflexion for the magnetization. In order to extract the Voigt rotation, we consider $n_0= \eta + i~\kappa$, $Q = Q_r + i~Q_i$ and $B_1$ real. Then we have to calculate the real part of (14). The resulting expression is then inserted in (8). In the approximation of no absorption, one obtains for the Voigt rotation in transmission geometry:
$$(15) \quad \delta \beta = (\mu_0 H)^2 \frac{B_1 + n_0^2 \Big[\frac{2L\omega}{c}(1+n_0) Q_i Q_r + Q_r^2-Q_i^2\Big]}{n_0 (1+n_0)}$$

== Illustration of Voigt effect in GaMnAs ==
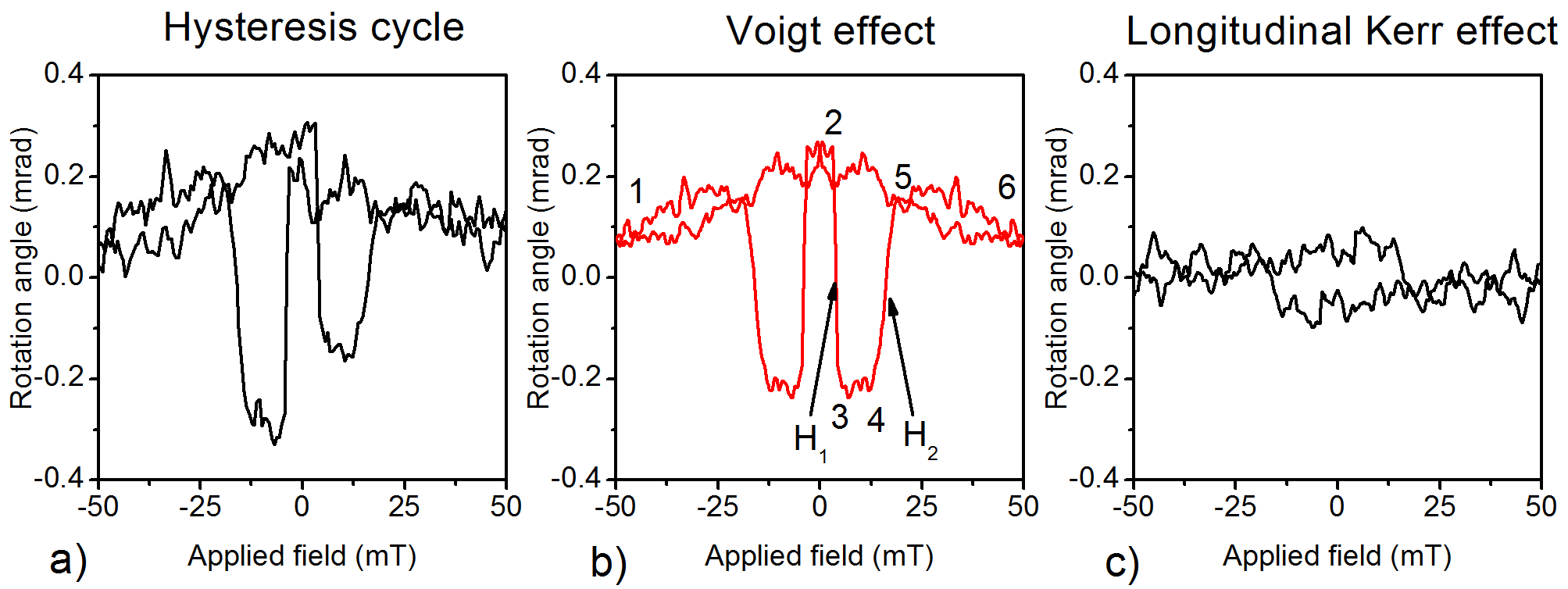
Fig 1 : a) Experimental hysteresis cycle on a planar (Ga,Mn)As sample b) Voigt hysteresis cycle obtained by extracting the symmetric part of (a). c) Longitudinal Kerr obtained by extracting the asymmetric part of (a)

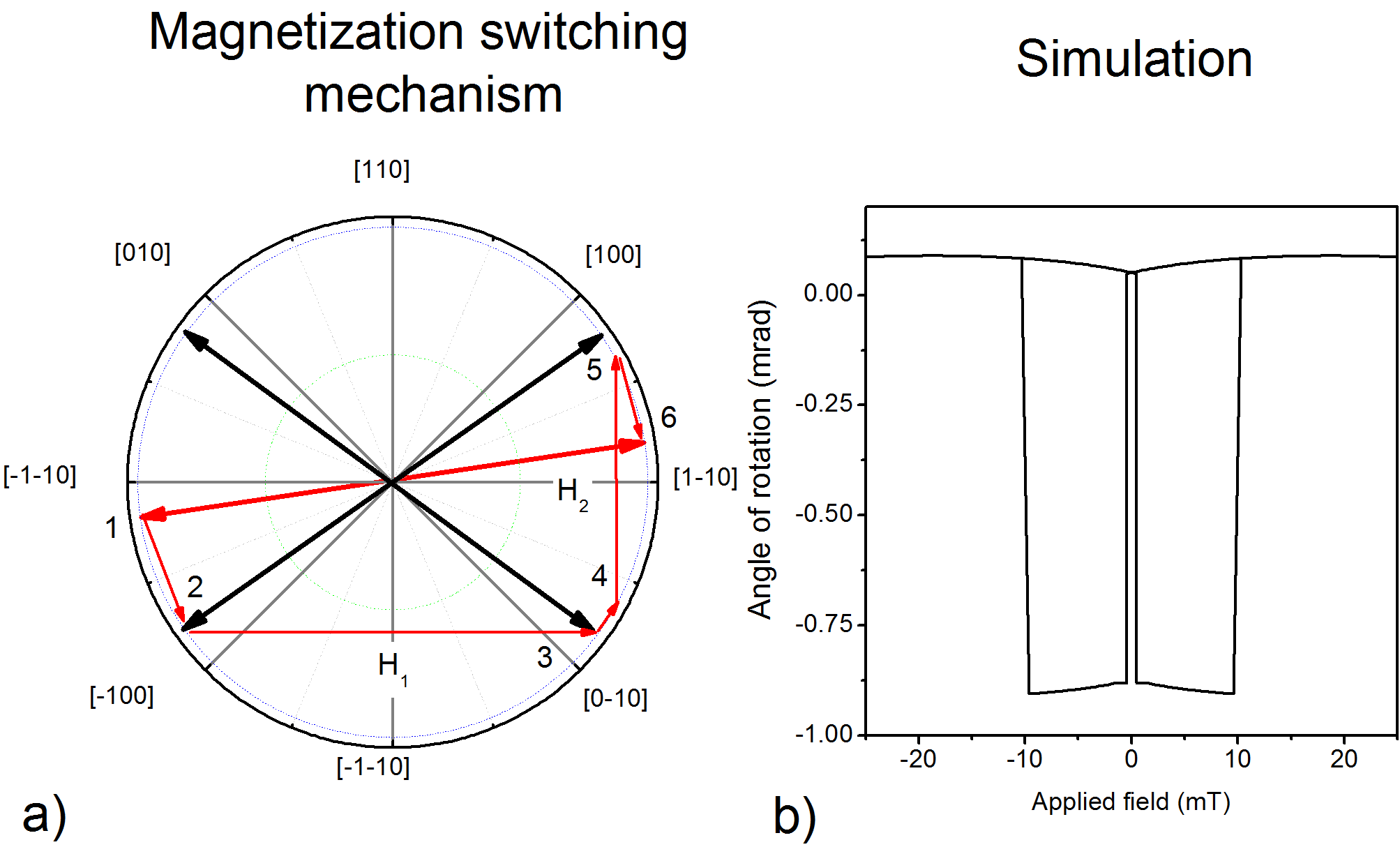
Fig 2 : a) Switching mechanism of an in-plane (Ga,Mn)As sample for a magnetic field applied along the [1-10] axis at 12 K. b) Voigt signal simulated from the mechanism showed in a)

As an illustration of the application of the Voigt effect, we give an example in the magnetic semiconductor (Ga,Mn)As where a large Voigt effect was observed. At low temperatures (in general for $T < \frac{T_c}{2}$) for a material with an in-plane magnetization, (Ga,Mn)As exhibits a biaxial anisotropy with the magnetization aligned along (or close to) <100> directions.

A typical hysteresis cycle containing the Voigt effect is shown in figure 1. This cycle was obtained by sending a linearly polarized light along the [110] direction with an incident angle of approximately 3° (more details can be found in), and measuring the rotation due to magneto-optical effects of the reflected light beam. In contrast to the common longitudinal/polar Kerr effect, the hysteresis cycle is even with respect to the magnetization, which is a signature of the Voigt effect. This cycle was obtained with a light incidence very close to normal, and it also exhibits a small odd part; a correct treatment has to be carried out in order to extract the symmetric part of the hysteresis corresponding to the Voigt effect, and the asymmetric part corresponding to the longitudinal Kerr effect.

In the case of the hysteresis presented here, the field was applied along the [1-10] direction. The switching mechanism is as follows:

1. We start with a high negative field and the magnetization is close to the [-1-10] direction at position 1.
2. The magnetic field is decreasing leading to a coherent magnetization rotation from 1 to 2
3. At positive field, the magnetization switch brutally from 2 to 3 by nucleation and propagation of magnetic domains giving a first coercive field named here $H_1$
4. The magnetization stay close to the state 3 while rotating coherently to the state 4, closer from the applied field direction.
5. Again the magnetization switches abruptly from 4 to 5 by nucleation and propagation of magnetic domains. This switching is due to the fact that the final equilibrium position is closer from the state 5 with respect to the state 4 (and so his magnetic energy is lower). This gives another coercive field named $H_2$
6. Finally the magnetization rotates coherently from the state 5 to the state 6.

The simulation of this scenario is given in the figure 2, with
$$\operatorname{Re}\left[\frac{B_1+n_0^2 Q^{2}}{2 n_0 (n_0^2-1)}\right] P_\text{Voigt} = 0.5\,\mathrm{mrad}.$$
As one can see, the simulated hysteresis is qualitatively the same with respect to the experimental one. Notice that the amplitude at $H_1$ or $H_2$ are approximately twice of $P_\text{Voigt}$

== See also ==
- Atomic line filter
- Cotton–Mouton effect
- Faraday effect
