= Aimé Cotton =

French physicist (1869–1951)

Aimé Auguste Cotton
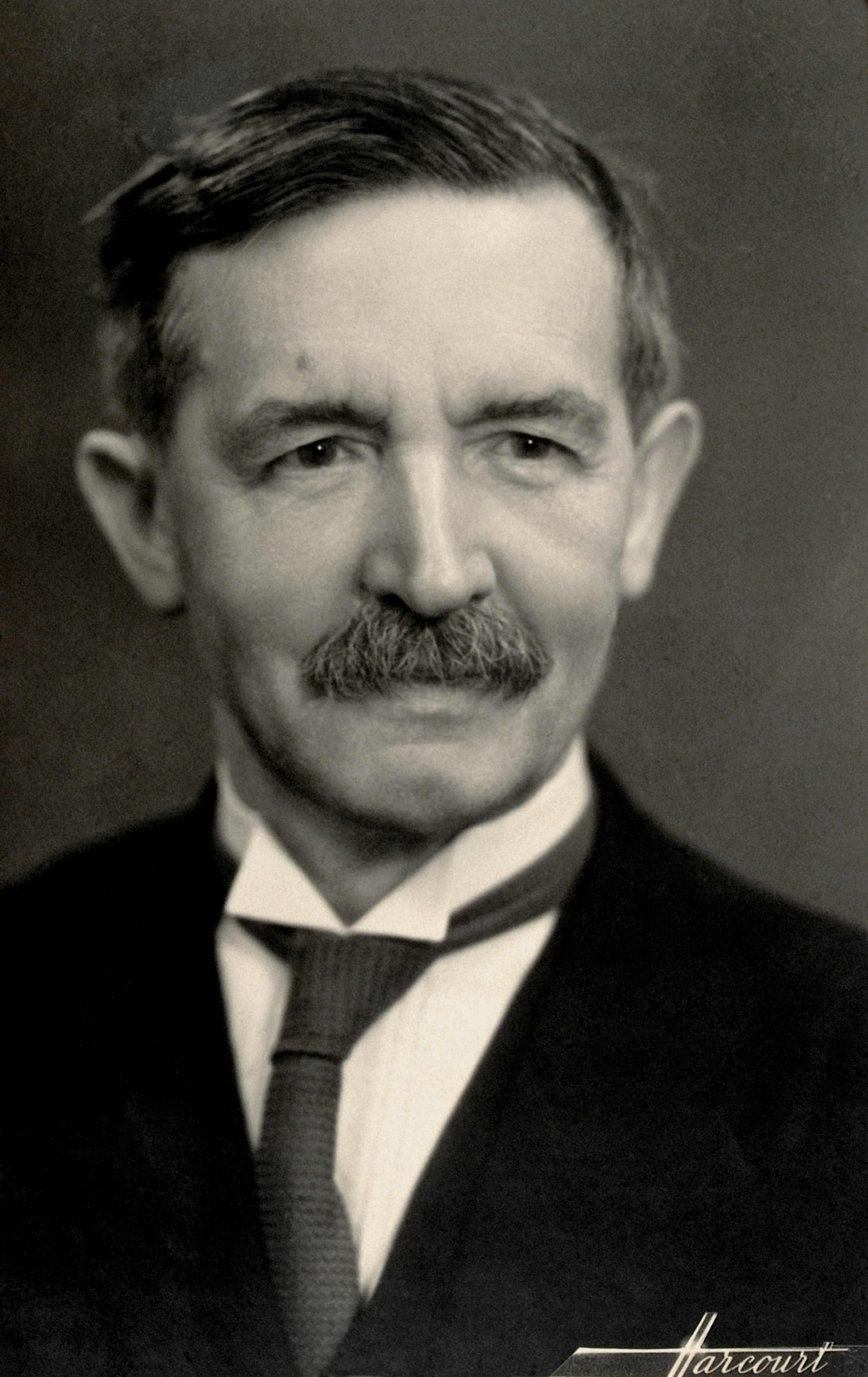
- Born: October 9, 1869; Bourg-en-Bresse, Ain, France
- Died: April 16, 1951 (aged 81); Sèvres, France
- Education: École normale supérieure
- Known for: Cotton effect Cotton–Mouton effect
- Spouse: Eugénie Cotton
- Scientific career
- Fields: Physics; Optics
- Workplaces: University of Paris
- Doctoral students: Pierre Jacquinot

Aimé Auguste Cotton (9 October 1869 – 16 April 1951) was a French physicist known for his studies of the interaction of light with chiral molecules. In the absorption bands of these molecules, he discovered large values of optical rotatory dispersion (ORD), or variation of optical rotation as a function of wavelength (Cotton effect), as well as circular dichroism or differences of absorption between left and right circularly polarized light.

== Biography ==
=== Early years ===
Aimé Cotton was born in Bourg-en-Bresse, Ain on 9 October 1869. His grandfather was director of the École normale (teachers' college) of Bourg, and his father, Eugène Cotton, was a mathematics professor at the college of Bourg, the institution where physicist André-Marie Ampère began his career. Aimé's brother Émile Cotton was a mathematician and academician.

Aimé Cotton attended a lycée (high school) in Bourg and then the special mathematics program at the Lycée Blaise Pascal in Clermont-Ferrand. He entered the École normale supérieure in 1889, and won the physical sciences prize on graduating in 1893.

=== Academic and scientific career ===
As a graduate student at the physics laboratory of the École normale supérieure, he then prepared his doctoral thesis in physical sciences. In this thesis he studied the interactions of polarized light with optically active substances containing chiral molecules. In absorption bands of these substances, he found large variations of optical rotation as a function of wavelength, now known as optical rotatory dispersion (ORD) or as the Cotton effect. He also discovered the related phenomenon of circular dichroism, or unequal absorption of left and right circularly polarized light. These two phenomena were later used to determine the stereochemistries of chiral molecules in organic chemistry and in biochemistry.

He was appointed maître de conférences in the science faculty at Toulouse in 1895, and defended his doctoral thesis in 1896 before the science faculty of the University of Paris. His thesis was entitled "Research on the absorption and dispersion of light by substances capable of optical rotation". In 1900, he was appointed assistant professor as a temporary replacement for Jules Violle. In 1904 he was appointed instructor, and in 1910 assistant professor at the science faculty of the University of Paris, assigned to the École normale supérieure, where he remained until 1922.

During this period his research dealt with the interactions of light and magnetism. He worked first with Pierre Weiss on the Zeeman effect, the splitting of spectral lines in the presence of a magnetic field. For this work he invented the Cotton balance to measure the magnetic field intensity precisely. With Weiss he studied the magnetic splitting of the blue lines of the zinc atom and in 1907 they were able to determine the ratio of the electron's charge to its mass (e/m) with better precision than the method of J.J. Thomson.

Cotton at the Fourth Conference International Union for Cooperation in Solar Research at Mount Wilson Observatory, 1910

Cotton then became interested in the Faraday effect near absorption lines and demonstrated magnetic circular dichroism. At the same time, he worked with his former classmate Henri Mouton, a biologist at the Pasteur Institute, on magnetic birefringence in colloïdal solutions of magnetic particles. In 1907 the two discovered the Cotton-Mouton effect, an intense magnetic birefringence with optical axis perpendicular to the magnetic field lines.

In 1913 he married physicist and activist Eugénie Feytis; they had four children.

During World War I he and Pierre Weiss developed the Cotton–Weiss system, based on an acoustic method, for locating enemy artillery.

He supervised the thesis work of Georges Bruhat on circular dichroïsm and optical rotatory dispersion (1914). In 1917 he helped to found the Institut d'optique théorique et appliquée. In 1914, he proposed construction of a large electromagnet capable of producing intense magnetic fields. Work on the magnet finally started in 1924 in the Service des recherches et inventions at Bellevue, later the Laboratoire du magnétisme at Meudon-Bellevue, and finally the Laboratoire Aimé-Cotton in his honour. Magnetic fields as high as to 7 teslas were attained.

In 1919, he became chairman of the physics committee of the Direction des Inventions intéressant la défense nationale (Directorate of Inventions relevant to National Defense). In 1920 he was named professor of the new chair of theoretical physics and astrophysics at the Faculty of Sciences of the University of Paris. In 1922 he succeeded Gabriel Lippmann in the chair of general physics, and at the same time became director of physics research in the faculty. In 1923 he was elected to the French Academy of Sciences, and in 1938 he was elected its president. The academy honored him three times.

He was nominated for a Nobel Prize six times.

He retired in 1941 and was replaced by Jean Cabannes as professor and laboratory directory, although he retained the direction of the magneto-optics laboratory at Bellevue.

In 1941 he was imprisoned by the German occupiers at Fresnes for one and a half months and was later awarded the Rosette de la résistance. At the age of 81 years, 6 months and 7 days, he died on April 16, 1951, at Sèvres.

== Publications ==
- Les Ultramicroscopes et les Objets Ultramicroscopiques
