= Cotton effect =

Atomic, molecular, and optical physics

The Cotton effect in physics, is the characteristic change in optical rotatory dispersion and/or circular dichroism in the vicinity of an absorption band of a substance. In a wavelength region where the light is absorbed, the absolute magnitude of the optical rotation at first varies rapidly with wavelength, crosses zero at absorption maxima and then again varies rapidly with wavelength but in the opposite direction. This phenomenon was discovered in 1895 by the French physicist Aimé Cotton (1869–1951).

The Cotton effect is called positive if the optical rotation first increases as the wavelength decreases (as first observed by Cotton), and negative if the rotation first decreases. A protein structure such as a beta sheet shows a negative Cotton effect.

== See also ==
- Cotton–Mouton effect
