= Wilhelmina Anna Lub =

- Born: 16 March 1900; Enkhuizen, The Netherlands
- Died: 23 December 1986 (aged 86); Enkhuizen, The Netherlands

Academic background
- Education: University of Amsterdam (PhD)
- Thesis: Over de polarisatie van het licht afkomstig van bewegende en stilstaande deeltjes der waterstof-kanaalstralen (1932)
- Doctoral advisor: Pieter Zeeman

Academic work
- Discipline: Physics
- Sub-discipline: Spectrum of actinium

Wilhelmina (Willy) Anna Lub (1900–1986) was a Dutch physicist who worked closely with Marie Curie in her Paris laboratory in the years up to her death, researching in particular the spectrum of actinium. She published a paper on the results in 1937 after returning to Amsterdam.

== Early life ==
Born on 16 March 1900 in the Dutch city of Enkhuizen, Wilhelmina Anne Lub (usually called Willy) was the daughter of the shoe shop owners William Lub (1873–1979) and his wife Alberdina née Koolhaas (1871–1936). She was the family's second of five children, three of whom died as infants. Lub attended local primary and secondary schools before graduating in physics at the University of Amsterdam.

== Career ==
In the early 1930s, while preparing her doctorate at the University of Amsterdam, Lub was the first to produce hydrogen canal rays enabling her to measure shifted hydrogen lines as compared to the original lines in connection with the Doppler-Fiseau effect.

Commenting on this achievement in January 1932 in a letter to Marie Curie, her mentor Pieter Zeeman asked whether Lub could spend a few months in her Paris laboratory after earning her doctorate. This she achieved in early May 1932. Lub was able to join the laboratory a few days later spending some of the summer months under Irène Curie following the indisposition of Marie after a holiday accident. Lub returned to the laboratory between October and December 1932, this time working closely with Marie Curie on determining the actinium spectrum despite major difficulties.

Following the insistance of Zeeman, Curie allowed Lub to return to the laboratory in January 1933, remaining until 25 April. Curie tried to obtain a grant for her to complete the work but was not successful. As a result, Zeeman offered to support her on half his salary. On this basis, Lub returned to the laboratory from October 1933 to the summer of 1934. Together with Curie, she was successful in researching the alpha rays actinium and they jointly the results in a paper published in 1933.

Lub returned to Amsterdam after Curie's death, continuing to research the actinium spectrum. She described the results in a paper published in 1937.

Wilhelmina Anna Lub died on 23 December 1986 in her native Enkhuizen.

== See also ==
- List of women associated with Marie Curie and Irène Joliot-Curie
