= Bommenede =

Coordinates: 51°44′N 3°56′E

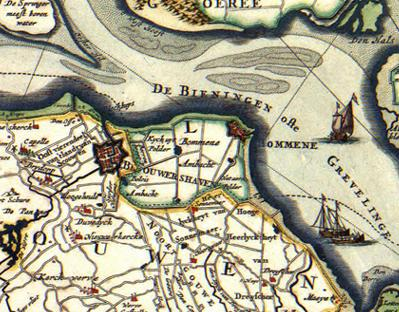
Bommenede (center, in green) in 1650

Bommenede or Bommenee is a former island, village, and municipality in the Netherlands, located about 5 km east of the city of Brouwershaven.

== Village of Bommenede ==
Bommenede was founded in the early 12th century by monks of the Cistercian monastery of Ter Duinen in Flanders. It was located on one of the four islands that later joined up to form the current island of Schouwen-Duiveland. The name was first mentioned in 1165, as insula Bomne. The island was a part of Holland, because the boundary between Holland and Zeeland lay in the Sonnemere, the water south of Bommenede.

According to the 19th-century historian A.J. van der Aa, John of Bavaria ordered the construction of dykes around the island in 1412, creating the polder of Bommenede. The village of Bommenede was listed in 1153 as property of the Cistercian monastery of Ter Duinen in Flanders. The village survived two floods in 1530 and 1532 and a fire in 1540. In 1570, Bommenede and the neighbouring polder "Kijkuit" were flooded during the All Saints' Flood.

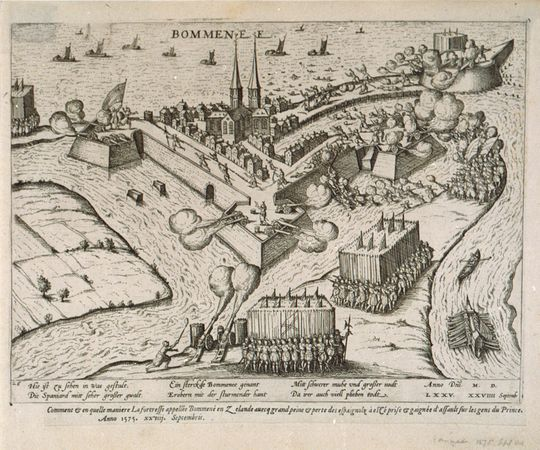
The siege of Bommenede (1575)

Because of the strategic location of the village, a defensive wall was built around it in 1574. The following year, the Spanish commander Mondragon besieged it for 20 days, and shot the village to pieces. At the end of the siege, no more than 20 healthy men survived in the village.

The village was flooded again on January 26, 1682. The destruction was so great, that the Estates of Holland decided not to rebuild the village, and the last inhabitants left in 1684. Some remains of the village (now sometimes referred to as Oud-Bommenede) remained visible for years. Nowadays, there is still some overgrown debris in the waters of the Grevelingen.

== Nieuw-Bommenede ==
Part of the former island was reclaimed from the sea in 1701. In the southern part of the new polder, a new hamlet grew: Nieuw-Bommenede. In the middle of the 19th century, it had about 410 inhabitants.

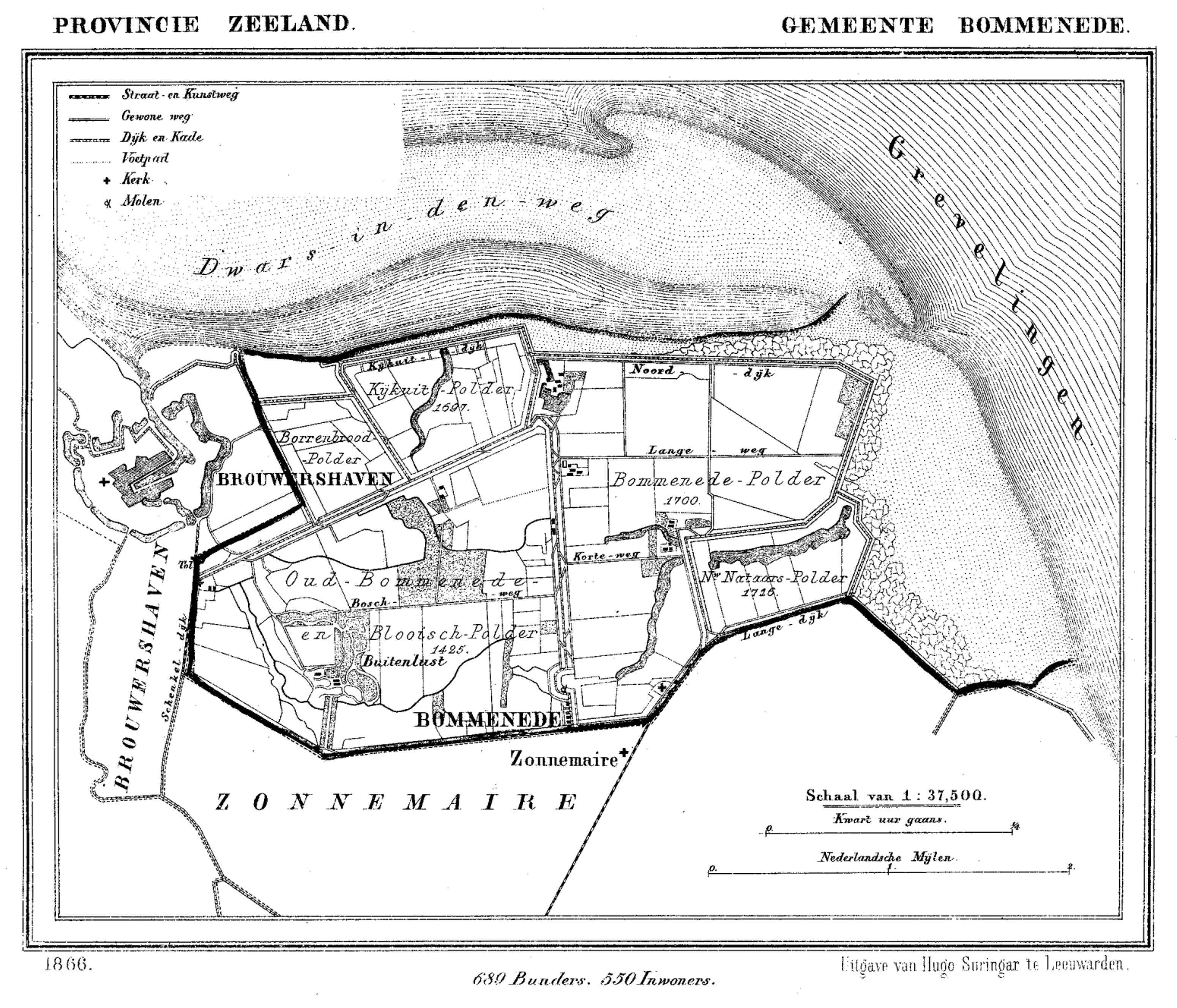
The municipality of Bommenede in 1866

Bommenede was a separate heerlijkheid, and later a separate municipality (also called "Bommenede en Bloois"), until it was merged with the municipality of Zonnemaire on January 4, 1866.
