= Pieter Zeeman =

Dutch physicist (1865–1943)

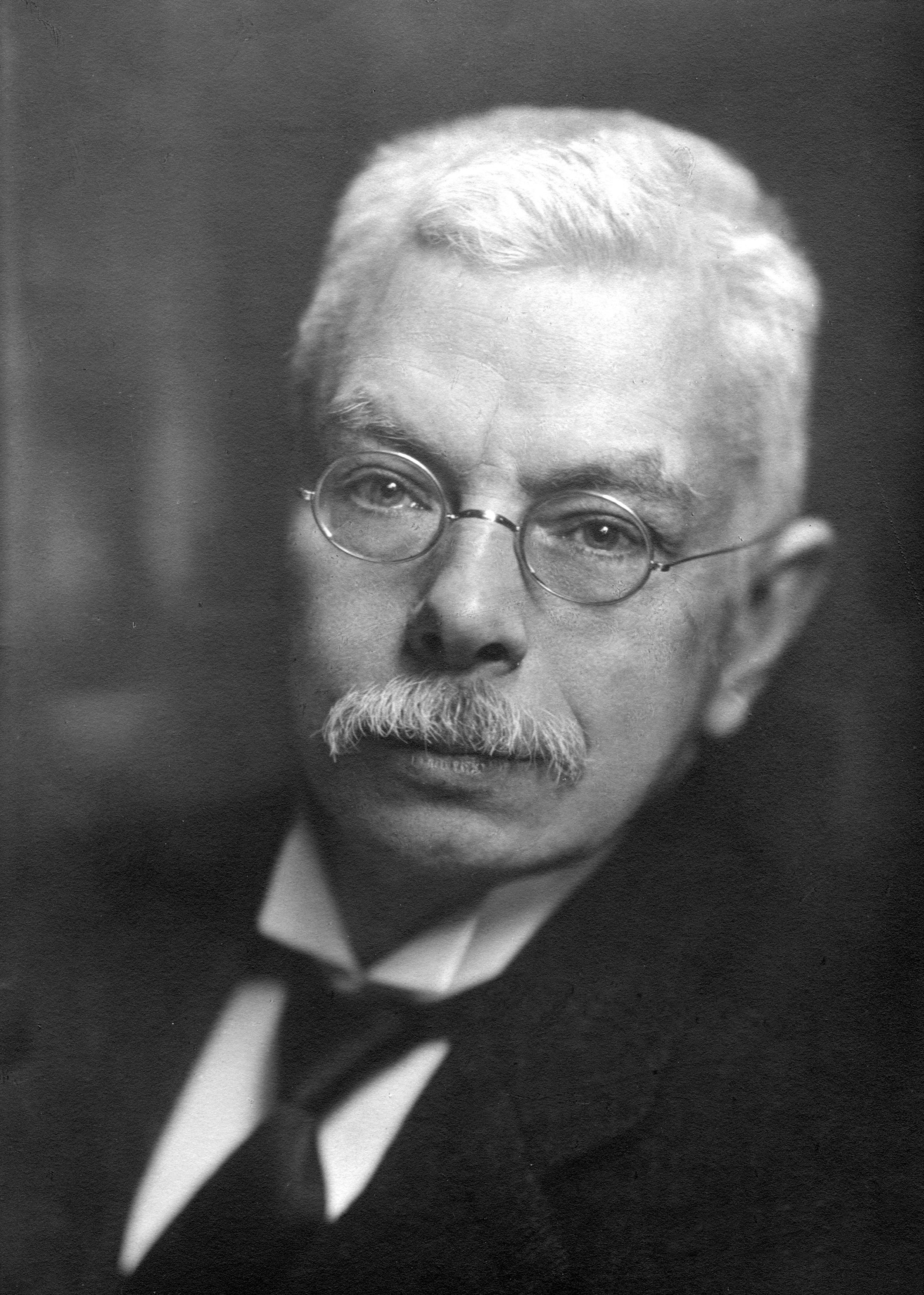
- Zeeman, c. 1920
- Born: 25 May 1865; Zonnemaire, Netherlands
- Died: 9 October 1943 (aged 78); Amsterdam, Netherlands
- Education: Leiden University: Doctor, Physics
- Known for: Zeeman effect
- Spouse: Johanna Elisabeth Lebret (m. 1895)
- Children: 4
- Awards: Nobel Prize in Physics (1902); Matteucci Medal (1912); Henry Draper Medal (1921); Rumford Medal (1922); Franklin Medal (1925)
- Scientific career
- Fields: Physics
- Workplaces: Leiden University; University of Amsterdam
- Thesis: Metingen over het verschijnsel van Kerr bij polaire terugkaatsing op ijzer, kobalt en nikkel, in 't bijzonder over Sissingh's magneto-optisch phaseverschil (1893)
- Doctoral advisor: Heike Kamerlingh Onnes
- Doctoral students: Cornelis Bakker; Wilhelmina Anna Lub

Pieter Zeeman (Note: /ˈzeɪmɑːn/ ZAY-mahn; Dutch: [ˈzeːmɑn]) (25 May 1865 – 9 October 1943) was a Dutch experimental physicist who shared the 1902 Nobel Prize in Physics with Hendrik Lorentz for their discovery and theoretical explanation of the Zeeman effect.

== Education ==
Pieter Zeeman was born on 25 May 1865 in Zonnemaire, Zeeland, Netherlands, the son of Wilhelmina (née Worst) and Catharinus Forandinus Zeeman, a minister of the Dutch Reformed Church. Zeeman became interested in physics at an early age. In 1883, the aurora borealis happened to be visible in the Netherlands; Zeeman, then a student at the high school in Zierikzee, made a drawing and description of the phenomenon and submitted it to Nature, where it was published. The editor praised "the careful observations of Professor Zeeman from his observatory in Zonnemaire."

After finishing high school in 1883, Zeeman went to Delft for supplementary education in classical languages, then a requirement for admission to university. He stayed at the home of Dr. J. W. Lely, co-principal of the gymnasium and brother of Cornelis Lely, who was responsible for the concept and realization of the Zuiderzee Works. While in Delft, he first met Heike Kamerlingh Onnes, who would become his doctoral advisor.

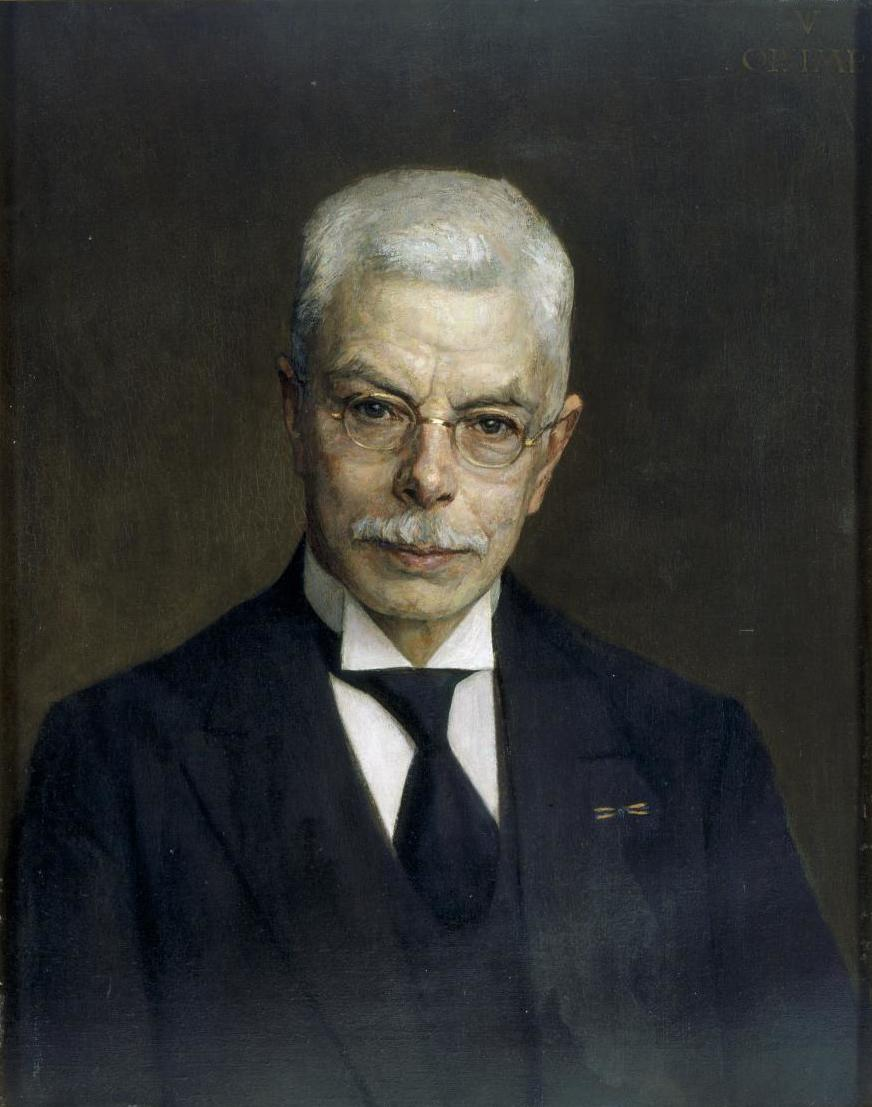
Portrait of Pieter Zeeman by Jan Veth, 1925.

In 1885, Zeeman entered Leiden University, where he studied mechanics under Kamerlingh Onnes and experimental physics under Hendrik Lorentz. In 1890, he became an assistant to Lorentz, which allowed him to participate in a research programme on the Kerr effect. In 1893, he submitted his doctoral thesis on the Kerr effect, the reflection of polarized light on a magnetized surface. After receiving his doctorate, he went to Friedrich Kohlrausch's institute at the University of Strasbourg, where he worked under Emil Cohn. He returned to Leiden in 1894, and became a Privatdozent at Leiden University in 1895.

== Zeeman effect ==
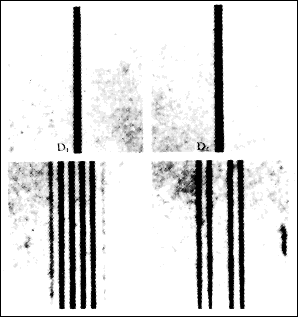
A photo Zeeman took of the Zeeman effect.

In 1896, shortly before moving from Leiden to Amsterdam, Zeeman measured the splitting of spectral lines by a strong magnetic field, a discovery now known as the Zeeman effect. This research involved an investigation of the effect of magnetic fields on a light source. He discovered that a spectral line is split into several components in the presence of a magnetic field. Hendrik Lorentz first heard about Zeeman's observations on Saturday 31 October 1896 at the meeting of the Royal Netherlands Academy of Arts and Sciences, where these results were communicated by Heike Kamerlingh Onnes. The next Monday, Lorentz called Zeeman into his office and presented him with an explanation of his observations, based on Lorentz's theory of electromagnetic radiation. In 1902, Zeeman and Lorentz were jointly awarded the Nobel Prize in Physics for their respective experimental and theoretical work on the Zeeman effect.

The importance of Zeeman's discovery soon became apparent; it confirmed Lorentz's prediction about the polarization of light emitted in the presence of a magnetic field. Thanks to Zeeman's work, it became clear that the oscillating particles, according to Lorentz were the source of light emission, were negatively charged, and were a thousandfold lighter than the hydrogen atom. This conclusion was reached well before J. J. Thomson's discovery of the electron. The Zeeman effect thus became an important tool for elucidating the structure of the atom.

== Career in Amsterdam ==
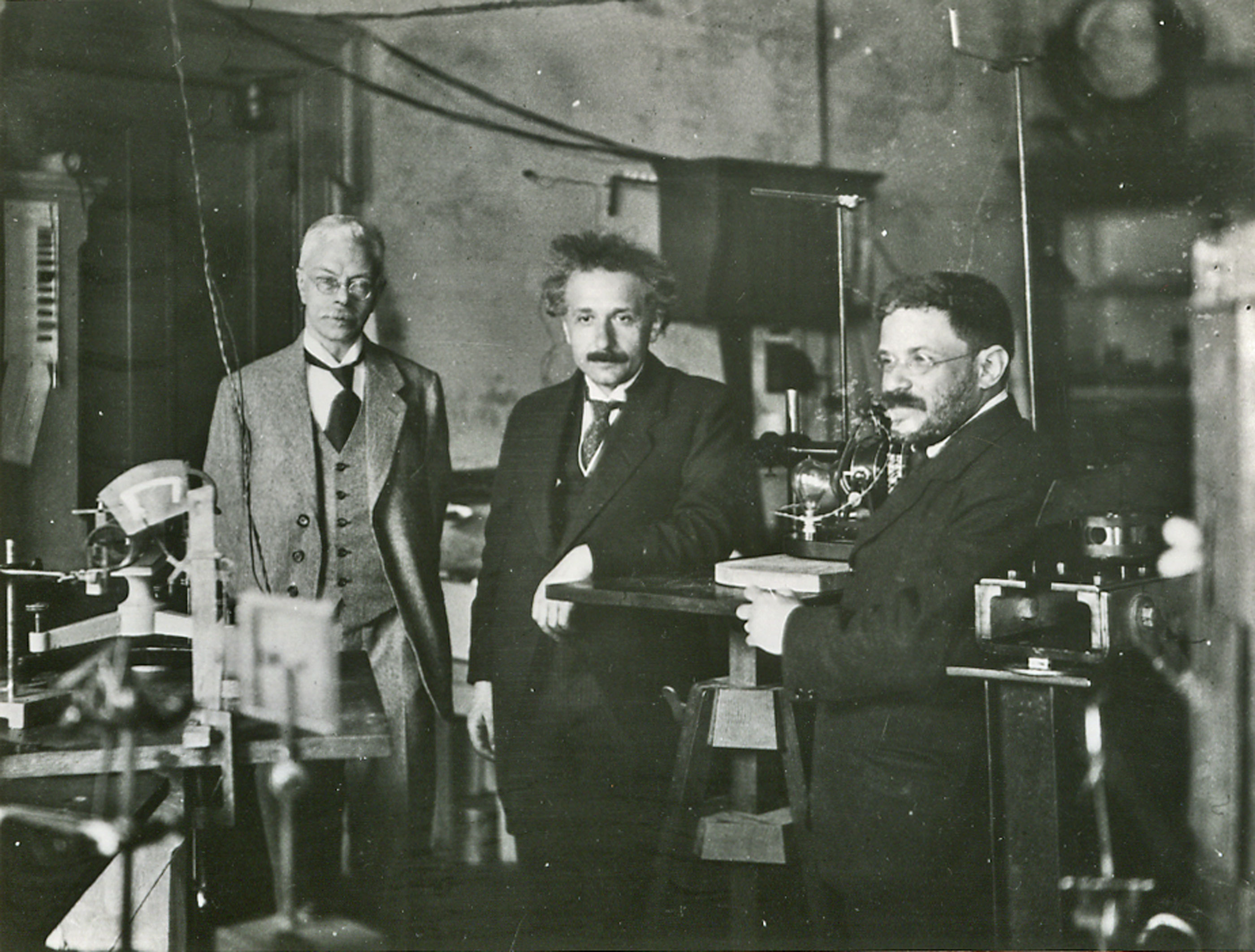
Albert Einstein visiting Pieter Zeeman (left) in Amsterdam, accompanied by Paul Ehrenfest (circa 1920).

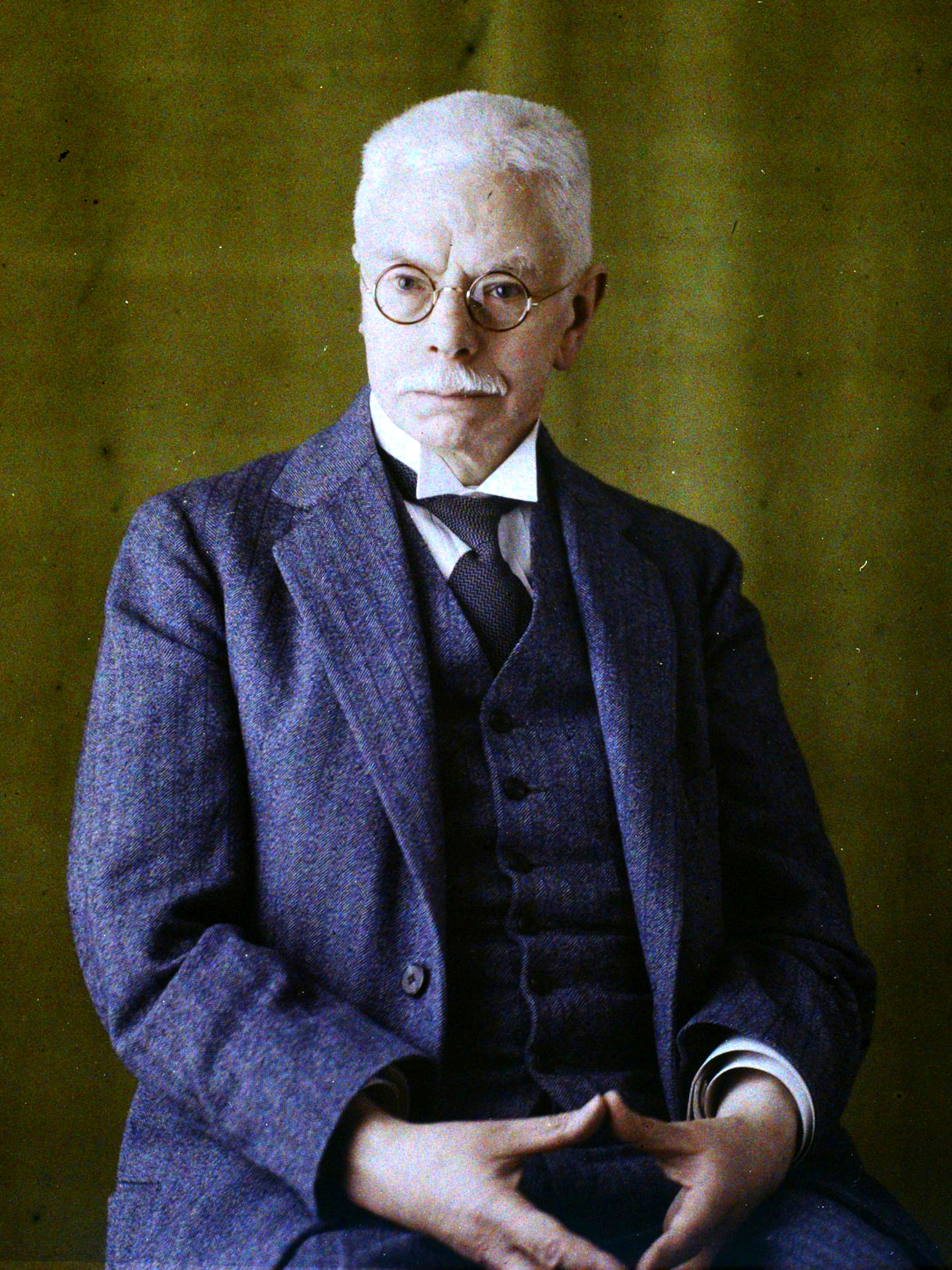
1929 Autochrome by Georges Chevalier.

Shortly after his discovery, Zeeman was offered a position as a lecturer at the University of Amsterdam, where he started to work in the autumn of 1896. This was followed by his promotion to Professor of Physics in 1900. In 1908, he succeeded Johannes van der Waals as full professor and Director of the Physics Institute. He retired as a professor in 1935.

In 1918, Zeeman published "Some experiments on gravitation: The ratio of mass to weight for crystals and radioactive substances" in the Proceedings of the Koninklijke Nederlandse Akademie van Wetenschappen, experimentally confirming the equivalence principle with regard to gravitational and inertial mass.

A new laboratory built in Amsterdam in 1923 was renamed the Zeeman Laboratory in 1940. This new facility allowed Zeeman to pursue a refined investigation of the Zeeman effect. For the remainder of his career he remained interested in research in magneto-optic effects. He also investigated the propagation of light in moving media. This subject became the focus of a renewed interest because of special relativity, and enjoyed a keen interest from Lorentz and Albert Einstein. Later in his career, he became interested in mass spectrometry.

== Personal life and death ==
In 1895, Zeeman married Johanna Elisabeth Lebret (1873–1962), with whom he had three daughters and one son.

Zeeman died on 9 October 1943 in Amsterdam at the age of 78, and was buried in Haarlem.

== Recognition ==
=== Memberships ===
| Year | Organization | Type | Ref. |
|---|---|---|---|
| 1898 | Royal Netherlands Academy of Arts and Sciences | Member | |
| 1921 | Royal Society | Foreign Member | |
| 1936 | Pontifical Academy of Sciences | Academician | |

=== Awards ===
| Year | Organization | Award | Co-recipients | Citation | Ref. |
|---|---|---|---|---|---|
| 1902 | Royal Swedish Academy of Sciences | Nobel Prize in Physics | Hendrik Lorentz | "In recognition of the extraordinary service they rendered by their researches into the influence of magnetism upon radiation phenomena." | |
| 1912 | Accademia dei XL | Matteucci Medal | — | — | |
| 1921 | National Academy of Sciences | Henry Draper Medal | — | "For his discovery of the so-called Zeeman effect and for its application on magneto-optics." | |
| 1922 | Royal Society | Rumford Medal | — | "For his researches in optics." | |
| 1925 | Franklin Institute | Franklin Medal | — | "[For the] discovery of the effect of a magnetic field upon the frequencies of the light from a radiating source." | |

== See also ==
- Atom and Atomic Theory
- Bohr–Sommerfeld model
- Fresnel drag coefficient
- Light-dragging effects
