= Cotton–Mouton effect =

Birefringence in a liquid in the presence of a constant transverse magnetic field

In physical optics, the Cotton–Mouton effect is the birefringence in a liquid in the presence of a constant transverse magnetic field. It is a similar but stronger effect than the Voigt effect (in which the medium is a gas). Its electric analog is the Kerr effect.

It was discovered in 1905 by Aimé Cotton and Henri Mouton, working in collaboration and publishing in Comptes rendus hebdomadaires des séances de l'Académie des sciences.

When a linearly polarized wave propagates perpendicularly to a magnetic field (e.g. in a magnetized plasma), it can become elliptically polarized. Because a linearly polarized wave is some combination of in-phase X and O modes, and because X and O waves propagate with different phase velocities, there is elliptization of the emerging beam. As the waves propagate, the phase difference (δ) between E_{X} and E_{O} increases.

== See also ==
- Cotton effect
