= Henri Mouton (scientist) =

Henri Mouton (5 September 1869 – 13 June 1935) was a French scientist.

He entered the École normale supérieure in 1889. He was a biologist at the Institut Pasteur, then maître de conférences at the Faculté des sciences in Paris from 1917, and finally professor of physical chemistry from 1927. He is best known for his discovery in 1907 of the Cotton-Mouton effect in collaboration with Aimé Cotton.

== Publications ==
- Les Ultramicroscopes et les Objets Ultramicroscopiques
