= Raman optical activity =

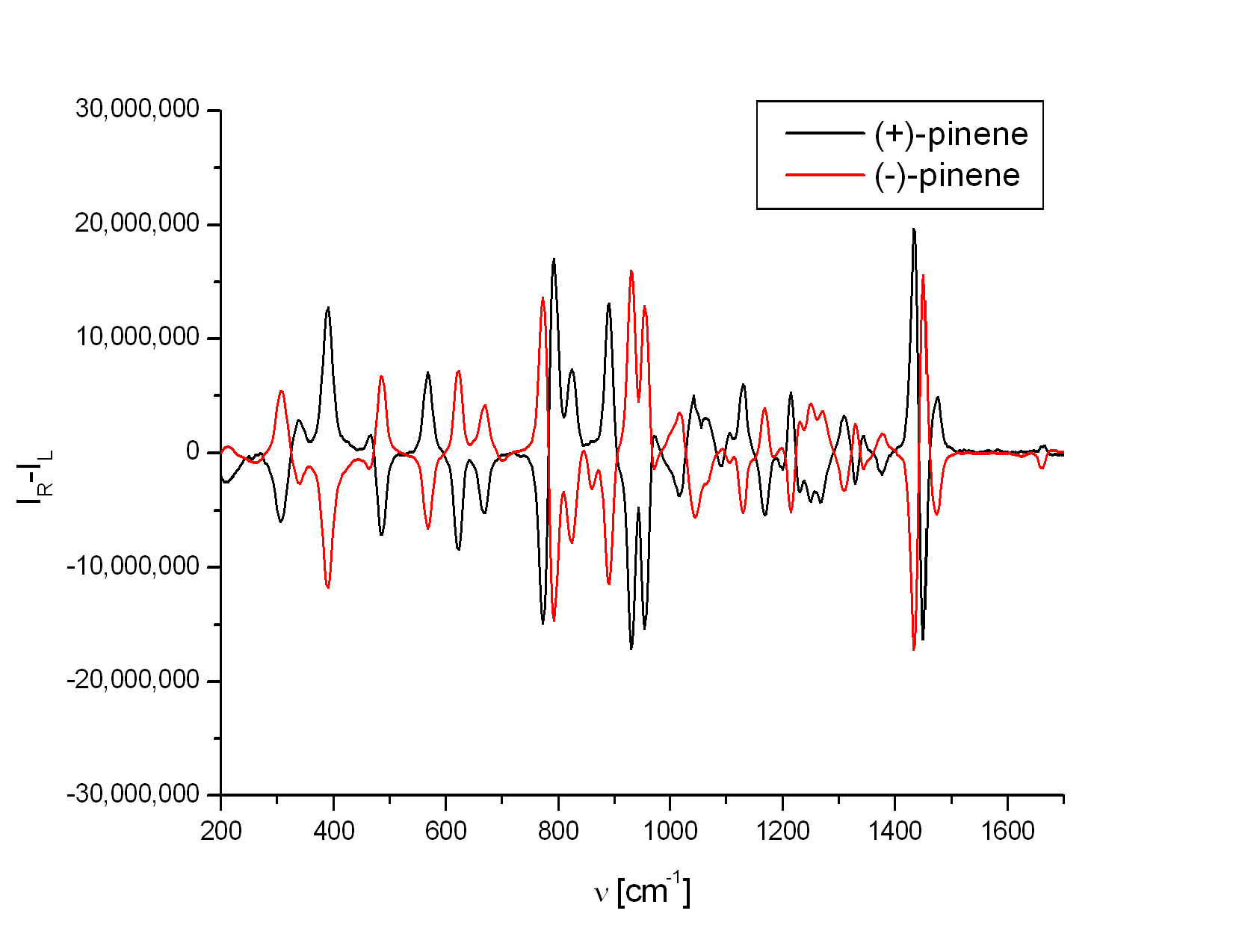
ROA spectra of (+) i (-) pinene

Raman optical activity (ROA) is a vibrational spectroscopic technique that is reliant on the difference in intensity of Raman scattered right and left circularly polarized light due to molecular chirality.

== History of Raman optical activity ==
The field began with the doctoral work of Laurence D. Barron with Peter Atkins at the University of Oxford and was later further developed by Barron with David Buckingham at the University of Cambridge.

More developments, including important contributions to the development of practical Raman optical activity instruments, were made by Werner Hug of the University of Fribourg, and Lutz Hecht with Laurence Barron at the University of Glasgow.

== Theory of Raman optical activity ==
The basic principle of Raman optical activity is that there is interference between light waves scattered by the polarizability and optical activity tensors of a chiral molecule, which leads to a difference between the intensities of the right- and left-handed circularly polarised scattered beams. The spectrum of intensity differences recorded over a range of wavenumbers reveals information about chiral centres in the sample molecule.

Raman optical activity can be observed in a number of forms, depending on the polarization of the incident and the scattered light. For instance, in the scattered circular polarization (SCP) experiment, the incident light is linearly polarized and differences in circular polarization of the scattered light are measured. In the dual circular polarization (DCP), both the incident and the scattered light are circularly polarized, either in phase (DCPI ) or out of phase (DCPII ).

== Biological Raman optical activity spectroscopy ==
Due to its sensitivity to chirality, Raman optical activity is a useful probe of biomolecular structure and behaviour in aqueous solution. It has been used to study protein, nucleic acid, carbohydrate and virus structures. Though the method does not reveal information to the atomic resolution of crystallographic approaches, it is able to examine structure and behaviour in biologically more realistic conditions (compare the dynamic solution structure examined by Raman optical activity to the static crystal structure).

== Related spectroscopic methods ==
Raman optical activity spectroscopy is related to Raman spectroscopy and circular dichroism. Recent studies have shown how by using optical vortex light beams, a distinct type of Raman optical activity that is sensitive to the orbital angular momentum of the incident light is manifest.

== Raman optical activity instruments ==
Much of the existing work in the field has utilised custom-made instruments, though commercial instruments are now available.

Enantios AG, a spin off of ETH Zurich has a CE certified forward-scattering ROA instrument on the market based on the paper published by founder Carin R. Lightner during her PhD.

== The thinnest chirality assessed by ROA ==
The symmetry of the neopentane molecule can be broken if some hydrogen atoms are replaced by deuterium atoms. In particular, if each methyl group has a different number of substituted atoms (0, 1, 2, and 3), one obtains a chiral molecule. The chirality in this case arises solely by the mass distribution of its nuclei, while the electron distribution is still essentially achiral. This chirality is the thinnest one synthesized so far and was assessed by ROA in 2007.

== See also ==
- Linear dichroism
- Magnetic circular dichroism
- Optical activity
- Optical isomerism
- Optical rotation
- Optical rotatory dispersion
- Hyper Rayleigh Scattering Optical Activity
- Two-photon circular dichroism
- Vibrational circular dichroism

== Bibliography ==
- Laurence D. Barron, Fujiang Zhu, Lutz Hecht, George E. Tranter, Neil W. Isaacs, Raman optical activity: An incisive probe of molecular chirality and biomolecular structure, Journal of Molecular Structure, 834–836 (2007) 7–16.
