= Two-photon circular dichroism =

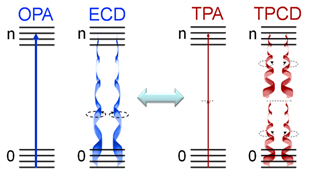
Figure 1. Comparative schematic between one-photon absorption (OPA) and TPA processes as well as ECD and degenerate TPCD.

Two-photon circular dichroism (TPCD), the nonlinear counterpart of electronic circular dichroism (ECD), is defined as the differences between the two-photon absorption (TPA) cross-sections obtained using left circular polarized light and right circular polarized light (see Figure 1).

== Background ==
Typically, two-photon absorption (TPA) takes place at twice the wavelength as one-photon absorption (OPA). This feature allows for the TPCD based study of chiral systems in the far to near ultraviolet (UV) region. ECD cannot be employed in this region due to interferences from strong linear absorption of typical buffers and solvents and also because of the scattering exhibited by inhomogeneous samples in this region. Several other advantages are associated with the use of non-linear absorption, i.e. high spatial resolution, enhanced penetration depth, improved background discrimination and reduced photodamage to living specimens. In addition, the fact that TPA transitions obey different selection rules than OPA (even-parity vs. odd-parity) leads to think that in chiral molecules ECD and TPCD should present different spectral features, thus making the two methods complementary. TPCD is very sensitive to small structural and conformational distortions of chiral molecules, and therefore, is potentially useful for the fundamental study of optically active molecules. Finally, TPCD has the potential to penetrate into the far-UV region, where important structural/conformational information is typically obscure to ECD. This would enable the discovery of new information about molecular systems of interest such as, peptides, biological macromolecules (allowing for a deeper understanding of diseases like Alzheimer's and Parkinson's) and potential candidates for negative refractive index (for the developing of cloaking devices).

TPCD has been applied in experiments using pump-probe, intensity dependent multiphoton optical rotation, resonance-enhanced multiphoton ionization, and polarization modulation single beam Z-scan. The first experimental measurement of TPCD was performed in 1995 using a fluorescence based technique (FD-TPCD), but it was not until the introduction of the double L-scan technique in 2008 by Hernández and co-workers, that a more reliable and versatile technique to perform TPCD measurements became available. Since the introduction of the double L-scan several theoretical-experimental studies based on TPCD have been published, i.e. TPCD of asymmetric catalysts, effect of the curvature of the π-electron delocalization on the TPCD signal, fragmentation-recombination approach (FRA) for the study of TPCD of large molecules and the development of an FD-TPCD based microscopy technique. Additionally, Rizzo and co-workers have reported purely theoretical works on TPCD.

== Theory ==
TPCD was theoretically predicted by Tinoco and Power in 1975, and computationally implemented three decades later by Rizzo and co-workers, using DALTON and later at the CC2 level in the TURBOMOLE package. The expression for TPCD, defined as, $\Delta \delta (\lambda) = \delta_L^{TPA} (\lambda) - \delta_R^{TPA} (\lambda)$ , was obtained by Tinoco in his 1975 paper as a semiclassical extension of the TPA formulae. Quantum electrodynamical equivalent expressions were obtained by Power, by Andrews and, in a series of papers, by Meath and Power who were able to generalize the approach to the case of n photons, and considered also the modifications occurring in the formulae when elliptical polarization is assumed.

TPCD can be obtained theoretically using Tinoco's equation

$$\Delta \delta^{TPCD} (\omega) = \frac{4}{15} \frac{(2\pi)^3}{c_0^3 (4\pi\epsilon_0)^2} \times \omega^2 \sum_{f} g (2\omega, \omega_{0f}, \Gamma)\sdot R_{0f}^{TPCD} (\omega_{0f})$$

where $\omega$ is the circular frequency of the incident radiation, $\omega_{0f}$ is the circular frequency for a given 0→f transition, $R^{TPCD}_{0f}(\omega_{0f})$ is the TPCD rotatory strength, $g(2\omega,2\omega_{0f},\Gamma)$ is a normalized lineshape, $\epsilon_0$ is the electric constant and $c_0$ is the speed of light in vacuum.

$R^{TPCD}_{0f}(\omega_{0f})$, is obtained from

$$R^{TPCD}_{0f}(\omega_{0f})=-b_1B^{TI}_1(\omega_{0f})-b_2B^{TI}_2(\omega_{0f})-b_3B^{TI}_3(\omega_{0f})$$

where the $b_n$ terms refer to the experimental relative orientation of the two incident photons. For the typical double-L scan setup, $b_1=6$, and $b_2=-b_3=2$, which corresponds to two left or right circularly polarized photons propagating parallel to each other and in the same direction. The molecular parameters are obtained from the following equations,

$$B^{TI}_1(\omega_{0f}) = \frac{1}{\omega^3}\sum_{\rho\sigma}M^{p,0f}_{\rho\sigma}(\omega_{0f})P^{p^*,0f}_{\rho\sigma}(\omega_{0f})$$

$$B^{TI}_2(\omega_{0f})=\frac{1}{2\omega^3}\sum_{\rho\sigma}T^{+,0f}_{\rho\sigma}(\omega_{0f})P^{p^*,0f}_{\rho\sigma}(\omega_{0f})$$

$$B^{TI}_3(\omega_{0f})=\frac{1}{\omega^3}\sum_{\rho\sigma}M^{p,0f}_{\rho\sigma}(\omega_{0f})P^{p^*,0f}_{\sigma\sigma}(\omega_{0f})$$

where the molecular parameters are defined in function of the two-photon generalized tensors, $M^{p,0f}_{\rho\sigma}(\omega_{0f})$ (involving magnetic transition dipole matrix elements), $P^{p^*,0f}_{\rho\sigma}(\omega_{0f})$ (involving electric transition dipole matrix elements in the form of the velocity operator) and $T^{+,0f}_{\rho\sigma}(\omega_{0f})$ (including electric quadrupole transition matrix elements, in the velocity formulation).

== Experiments ==
=== Double L-scan ===
The double L-scan is an experimental method that allows obtaining simultaneously polarization dependent TPA effects in chiral molecules. Performing measurements on equal “twin” pulses allows compensating for energy and mode fluctuations in the sample that can mask the small TPCD signal.

To briefly describe the setup, short pulses coming from the excitation source (typically an OPG or an OPA) are split into “twin” pulses (at BS2), then the polarization of the pulses is controlled individually using quarter-waveplates (WP2 and WP3), allowing to perform simultaneous polarization dependent measurements. The sample is held in a 1 mm quartz cuvette and the incident angle of the light coming from both arms (M2 and M3) is 45°. The two incident beams have a separation on the vertical axis of about 1 cm, to avoid interference effects. Unlike Z-scan, in the double L-scan the sample is at fixed position and two identical focusing lenses (L2 and L3) move along the propagation axis (z axis). Calibration is required to ensure that z_{1}= z_{2} during the entire scan.

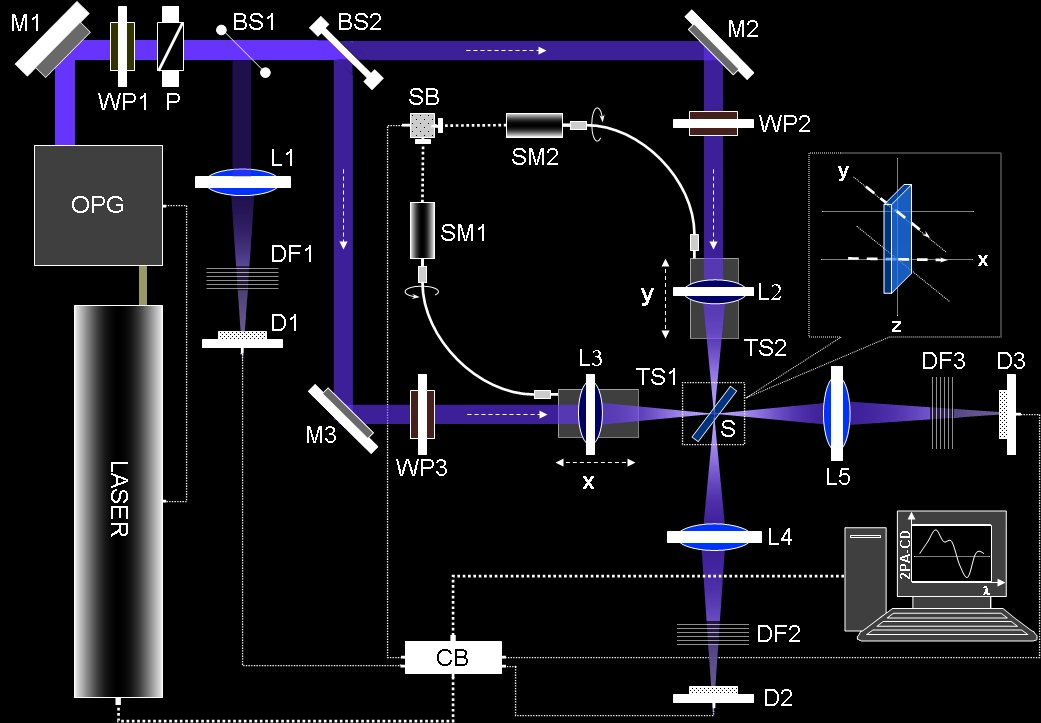
Double L-Scan Geometry. Mirrors (M1, M2, M3); wave plates (WP1, WP2, WP3); Glan polarizer (P); beam splitters (BS1, BS2); convergent lenses (L1, L2, L3, L4, L5); silicon detectors (D1, D2, D3); neutral density filters (DF1, DF2, DF3); translation stages (TS1, TS2); step-motors (SM1, SM2); synchronization box (SB); sample (S), and control box (CB).

== See also ==
- Birefringence
- Chirality (chemistry)
- Circular dichroism
- Cryptochirality
- Geometric phase
- Hyper–Rayleigh scattering optical activity
- Levorotation and dextrorotation
- Polarization
- Polarization rotator
- Raman optical activity (ROA)
- Specific rotation
