= Vibrational circular dichroism =

Infrared spectroscopy technique

Vibrational circular dichroism (VCD) is a spectroscopic technique which detects differences in attenuation of left and right circularly polarized light passing through a sample. It is the extension of circular dichroism spectroscopy into the infrared and near infrared ranges.

Because VCD is sensitive to the mutual orientation of distinct groups in a molecule, it provides three-dimensional structural information. Thus, it is a powerful technique as VCD spectra of enantiomers can be simulated using ab initio calculations, thereby allowing the identification of absolute configurations of small molecules in solution from VCD spectra. Among such quantum computations of VCD spectra resulting from the chiral properties of small organic molecules are those based on density functional theory (DFT) and gauge-including atomic orbitals (GIAO). As a simple example of the experimental results that were obtained by VCD are the spectral data obtained within the carbon-hydrogen (C-H) stretching region of 21 amino acids in heavy water solutions. Measurements of vibrational optical activity (VOA) have thus numerous applications, not only for small molecules, but also for large and complex biopolymers such as muscle proteins (myosin, for example) and DNA.

== Vibrational modes ==

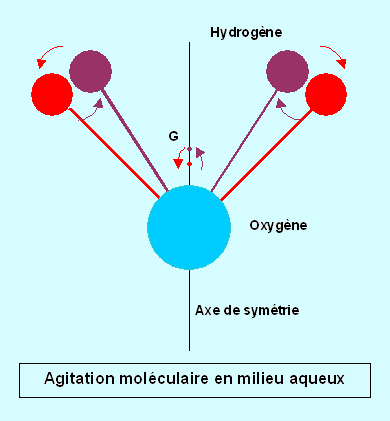

== Theory ==
While the fundamental quantity associated with the infrared absorption is the dipole strength, the differential absorption is also proportional to the rotational strength, a quantity which depends on both the electric and magnetic dipole transition moments. Sensitivity of the handedness of a molecule toward circularly polarized light results from the form of the rotational strength. A rigorous theoretical development of VCD was developed concurrently by the late Professor P.J. Stephens, FRS, at the University of Southern California, and the group of Professor A.D. Buckingham, FRS, at Cambridge University in the UK, and first implemented analytically in the Cambridge Analytical Derivative Package (CADPAC) by R.D. Amos. Previous developments by D.P. Craig and T. Thirmachandiman at the Australian National University and Larry A. Nafie and Teresa B. Freedman at Syracuse University though theoretically correct, were not able to be straightforwardly implemented, which prevented their use. Only with the development of the Stephens formalism as implemented in CADPAC did a fast efficient and theoretically rigorous theoretical calculation of the VCD spectra of chiral molecules become feasible. This also stimulated the commercialization of VCD instruments by Biotools, Bruker, Jasco and Thermo-Nicolet (now Thermo-Fisher).

== Peptides and proteins ==
Extensive VCD studies have been reported for both polypeptides and several proteins in solution; several recent reviews were also compiled. An extensive but not comprehensive VCD publications list is also provided in the "References" section. The published reports over the last 22 years have established VCD as a powerful technique with improved results over those previously obtained by visible/UV circular dichroism (CD) or optical rotatory dispersion (ORD) for proteins and nucleic acids.

The effects due to solvent on stabilizing the structures (conformers and zwitterionic species) of amino acids and peptides and the corresponding effects seen in the vibrational circular dichroism (VCD) and Raman optical activity spectra (ROA) have been recently documented by a combined theoretical and experimental work on L-alanine and N-acetyl L-alanine N'-methylamide. Similar effects have also been seen in the nuclear magnetic resonance (NMR) spectra by the Weise and Weisshaar NMR groups at the University of Wisconsin–Madison.

== Nucleic acids ==
VCD spectra of nucleotides, synthetic polynucleotides and several nucleic acids, including DNA, have been reported and assigned in terms of the type and number of helices present in A-, B-, and Z-DNA.

== Instrumentation ==
VCD can be regarded as a relatively recent technique. Although Vibrational Optical Activity and in particular Vibrational Circular Dichroism, has been known for a long time, the first VCD instrument was developed in 1973 and commercial instruments were available only since 1997.

For biopolymers such as proteins and nucleic acids, the difference in absorbance between the levo- and dextro- configurations is five orders of magnitude smaller than the corresponding (unpolarized) absorbance. Therefore, VCD of biopolymers requires the use of very sensitive, specially built instrumentation as well as time-averaging over relatively long intervals of time even with such sensitive VCD spectrometers. Most CD instruments produce left- and right- circularly polarized light which is then either sine-wave or square-wave modulated, with subsequent phase-sensitive detection and lock-in amplification of the detected signal. In the case of FT-VCD, a photo-elastic modulator (PEM) is employed in conjunction with an FTIR interferometer set-up. An example is that of a Bomem model MB-100 FTIR interferometer equipped with additional polarizing optics/ accessories needed for recording VCD spectra. A parallel beam emerges through a side port of the interferometer which passes first through a wire grid linear polarizer and then through an octagonal-shaped ZnSe crystal PEM which modulates the polarized beam at a fixed, lower frequency such as 37.5 kHz. A mechanically stressed crystal such as ZnSe exhibits birefringence when stressed by an adjacent piezoelectric transducer. The linear polarizer is positioned close to, and at 45 degrees, with respect to the ZnSe crystal axis. The polarized radiation focused onto the detector is doubly modulated, both by the PEM and by the interferometer setup. A very low noise detector, such as MCT (HgCdTe), is also selected for the VCD signal phase-sensitive detection. The first dedicated VCD spectrometer brought to market was the ChiralIR from Bomem/BioTools, Inc. in 1997. Today, Thermo-Electron, Bruker, Jasco and BioTools offer either VCD accessories or stand-alone instrumentation. To prevent detector saturation an appropriate, long wave pass filter is placed before the very low noise MCT detector, which allows only radiation below 1750 cm^{−1} to reach the MCT detector; the latter however measures radiation only down to 750 cm^{−1}. FT-VCD spectra accumulation of the selected sample solution is then carried out, digitized and stored by an in-line computer. Published reviews that compare various VCD methods are also available.

== Magnetic VCD ==
VCD spectra have also been reported in the presence of an applied external magnetic field. This method can enhance the VCD spectral resolution for small molecules.

== Raman optical activity (ROA) ==
ROA is a technique complementary to VCD especially useful in the 50–1600 cm^{−1} spectral region; it is considered as the technique of choice for determining optical activity for photon energies less than 600 cm^{−1}.

== See also ==
- Amino acid
- Birefringence
- Circular dichroism
- Density functional theory
- DNA
- DNA structure
- Hyper–Rayleigh scattering optical activity
- IR spectroscopy
- Magnetic circular dichroism
- Molecular models of DNA
- Nucleic acid
- Optical rotatory dispersion
- Photoelastic modulator
- Polarization
- Protein
- Protein structure
- Quantum chemistry
- Raman optical activity (ROA)
