= Hyper–Rayleigh scattering =

Optical phenomenon

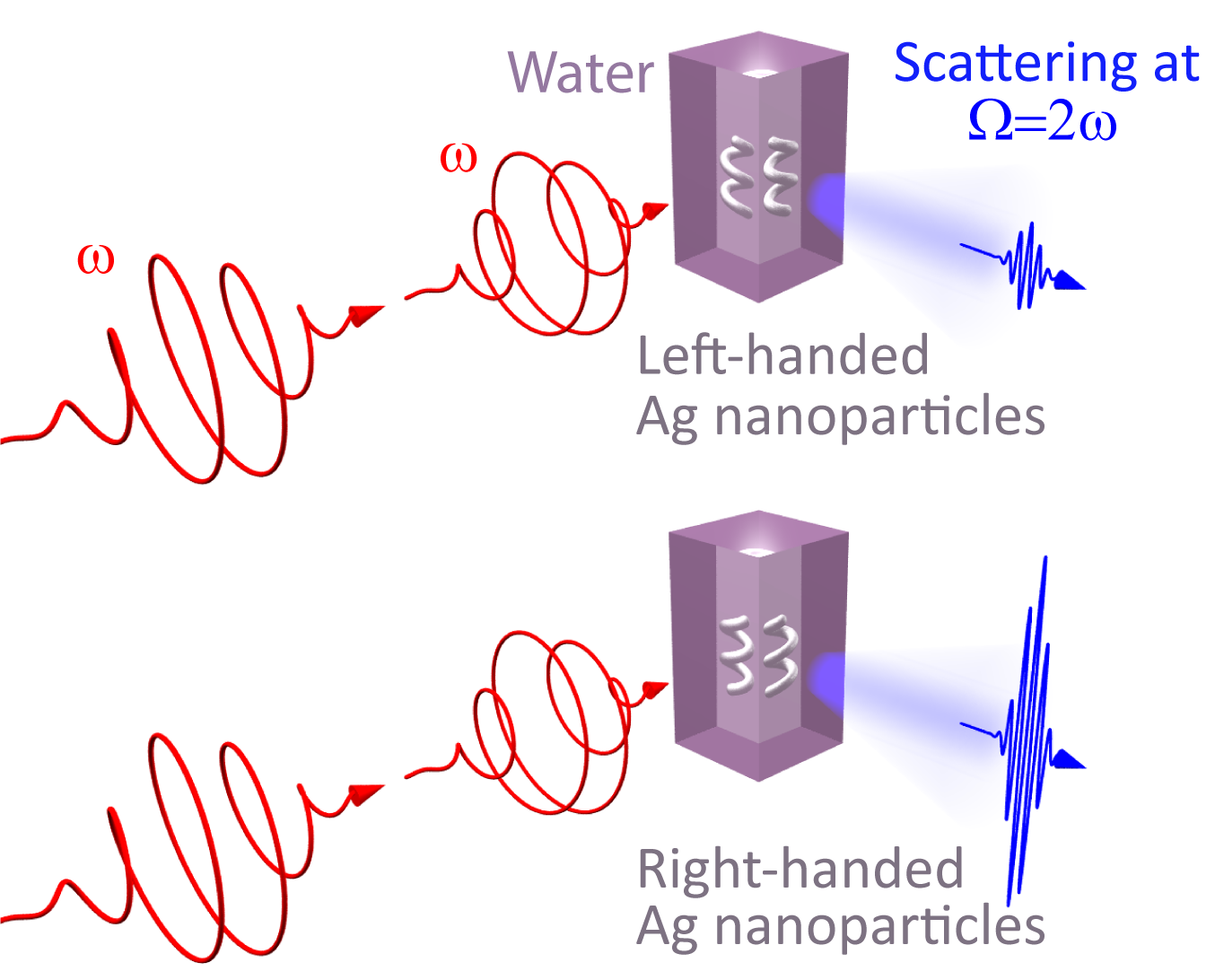
Diagram of the first observation of the hyper–Rayleigh scattering optical activity effect, from silver helical nanoparticles, upon illumination with circularly polarized light at frequency ω.

Hyper–Rayleigh scattering optical activity (/ˈreɪli/ RAY-lee), a form of chiroptical harmonic scattering, is a nonlinear optical physical effect whereby chiral scatterers (such as nanoparticles or molecules) convert light (or other electromagnetic radiation) to higher frequencies via harmonic generation processes, in a way that the intensity of generated light depends on the chirality of the scatterers. "Hyper–Rayleigh scattering" is a nonlinear optical counterpart to Rayleigh scattering. "Optical activity" refers to any changes in light properties (such as intensity or polarization) that are due to chirality.

== History ==
The effect was theoretically predicted in 1979, in a mathematical description of hyper Raman scattering optical activity. Within this theoretical model, upon setting the initial and final frequencies of light to the same value, the mathematics describe the hyper Rayleigh scattering optical activity. The theory was well in advance of its time, and the effect remained elusive for 40 years. Its author David L. Andrews referred to it as the "impossible theory". However, in January 2019, an experimental demonstration was reported by Ventsislav K. Valev and his team. The team investigated the hyper Rayleigh scattering (at the second harmonic generation frequency) from chiral nanohelices made of silver. Valev and his team observed that the intensity of the hyper Rayleigh scattering light depended on the direction of circularly polarized light and that this dependence reversed with the chirality of the nanohelices. Valev's work unambiguously established that the effect is physically possible, opening the way for nonlinear chiroptical investigations of a variety of chiral light-scattering materials; including molecules, plasmonic metal nanoparticles and semiconductor nanoparticles.

== Significance ==
Hyper Rayleigh scattering optical activity (HRS OA) is arguably the most fundamental nonlinear chiral optical (chiroptical) effect; since other nonlinear chiroptical effects have additional requirements, which make them conceptually more involved, i.e. less fundamental. HRS OA is a scattering effect and therefore it does not require the frequency conversion process to be coherent, contrary to other nonlinear chiroptical effects, such as second harmonic generation circular dichroism or second harmonic generation optical rotation. Moreover, HRS OA is a parametric process: the initial and final quantum mechanical states of the excited electron are the same. Because the excitation proceeds via virtual states, there is no restriction on the frequency of incident light. By contrast, other nonlinear scattering effects, such as two-photon circular dichroism and hyper-Raman are non-parametric: they require real energy states that restrict the frequencies at which these effects can be observed.

== In molecules ==
Soon after the first demonstration of hyper Rayleigh scattering optical activity in metal nanoparticles, the effect was replicated in organic molecules, specifically aromatic oligoamide foldamers.

== At the third harmonic ==
Whereas the initial experimental demonstration of hyper-Rayleigh scattering optical activity was observed at the second harmonic of the illumination frequency of light, the effect is general and can be observed at higher harmonics. The first demonstration of hyper-Rayleigh scattering optical activity at the third harmonic was reported by Valev's team in 2021, from silver nanohelices.

== See also ==
- Linear dichroism
- Magnetic circular dichroism
- Optical activity
- Optical isomerism
- Optical rotation
- Optical rotatory dispersion
- Protein circular dichroism data bank
- Raman optical activity (ROA)
- Two-photon circular dichroism
- Vibrational circular dichroism
