= TPCD =

TPCD may refer to:

- The Pussycat Dolls, an American pop girl group and dance ensemble of the 1990s and 2000s decades
- Two-photon circular dichroism
