= Ventsislav K. Valev =

Physicist and academic leader

Ventsislav Kolev Valev FInstP FRSC
- Prof Ventsislav K. Valev - 04 Oct 2026
- Born: August 31, 1976 (age 50); Silistra, Bulgaria
- Education: University of Western Brittany
- Known for: Nonlinear Optics; Chirality; Hyper Rayleigh Scattering Optical Activity
- Scientific career
- Fields: Physics; Nanophotonics; Plasmonics; Metamaterials
- Workplaces: University of Bath; University of Cambridge; KU Leuven; Radboud University
- Thesis: Investigation of Ferromagnetic/Antiferromagnetic Interfaces with Magnetization-Induced Second Harmonic Generation (2006)
- Doctoral advisor: Theo Rasing
- Other academic advisors: Jeremy Baumberg
- Website: valev.org

Ventsislav K. Valev, (born 31 August 1976 in Silistra, Bulgaria), is a Bulgarian physicist at the University of Bath, where he serves as the Associate Dean (Research), in the Faculty of Science. He works in the fields of nonlinear nanophotonics and chirality, including the Hyper Rayleigh Scattering Optical Activity effect.

== Career ==
Valev holds a PhD degree from Radboud University, obtained under the supervision of Prof. Theo Rasing. Valev joined the University of Bath as a University Research Fellow of the Royal Society and Reader (Associate Professor) in 2014. He served as the Head of the University's Department of Physics from 2022 to 2025.

== Research ==
Valev’s research has focused on nonlinear and chiral optical effects in nanostructured materials. In 2009, he and his colleagues used second-harmonic generation imaging to study electromagnetic responses in G-shaped gold nanostructures, introducing what they described as electromagnetic chiral hotspots. Later work from Valev and co-authors demonstrated sub-wavelength metal reshaping associated with temperature increases in plasmonic hotspots. Valev’s group has experimentally demonstrated several nonlinear chiral optical effects that were theoretically predicted decades earlier by David L. Andrews. This includes Hyper Rayleigh Scattering Optical Activity, Hyper-Mie Optical Activity, Hyper-Tyndall Optical Activity, and Hyper-Raman Optical Activity.

== Awards and recognition ==
- 2026, Elected Fellow of the American Physical Society.
- 2025, Elected Fellow of the Royal Society of Chemistry.
- 2023, Thomas Young Medal, from the Institute of Physics.
- 2023, Elected Optica Fellow.
- 2022, Elected Fellow of SPIE.
- 2022, Horizon Prize, from the Royal Society of Chemistry.
- 2021, Elected Fellow of the Institute of Physics, FInstP.
- 2018, Vice-Chancellor's Award for Public Engagement with Research.
