= Optical rotation =

Rotation of the plane of linearly polarized light as it travels through a chiral material

Operating principle of a polarimeter for measuring optical rotation.: 1. Light source; 2. Unpolarized light; 3. Linear polarizer; 4. Linearly polarized light; 5. Sample tube containing molecules under study; 6. Optical rotation (dextrorotatory, ~30°) due to chiral molecules; 7. Rotatable linear analyzer; 8. Detector

Optical rotation, also known as polarization rotation or circular birefringence, is the rotation of the orientation of the plane of polarization about the optical axis of linearly polarized light as it travels through certain materials. Circular birefringence and circular dichroism are the manifestations of optical activity. Optical activity occurs only in chiral materials, those lacking microscopic mirror symmetry. Unlike other sources of birefringence which alter a beam's state of polarization, optical activity can be observed in fluids. This can include gases or solutions of chiral molecules such as sugars, molecules with helical secondary structure such as some proteins, and also chiral liquid crystals. It can also be observed in chiral solids such as certain crystals with a rotation between adjacent crystal planes (such as quartz) or metamaterials.

When looking at the source of light, the rotation of the plane of polarization may be either to the right (dextrorotatory or dextrorotary — d-rotary, represented by (+), clockwise), or to the left (levorotatory or levorotary — l-rotary, represented by (−), counter-clockwise) depending on which stereoisomer is dominant. For instance, sucrose and camphor are d-rotary whereas cholesterol is l-rotary. For a given substance, the angle by which the polarization of light of a specified wavelength is rotated is proportional to the path length through the material and (for a solution) proportional to its concentration.

Optical activity is measured using a polarized source and polarimeter. This is a tool particularly used in the sugar industry to measure the sugar concentration of syrup, and generally in chemistry to measure the concentration or enantiomeric ratio of chiral molecules in solution. Modulation of a liquid crystal's optical activity, viewed between two sheet polarizers, is the principle of operation of liquid-crystal displays (used in most modern televisions and computer monitors).

== Forms ==
Dextrorotation and laevorotation (also spelled levorotation) in chemistry and physics are the optical rotation of plane-polarized light. From the point of view of the observer, dextrorotation refers to clockwise or right-handed rotation, and laevorotation refers to counterclockwise or left-handed rotation.

A chemical compound that causes dextrorotation is dextrorotatory or dextrorotary, while a compound that causes laevorotation is laevorotatory or laevorotary. Compounds with these properties consist of chiral molecules and are said to have optical activity. If a chiral molecule is dextrorotary, its enantiomer (geometric mirror image) will be laevorotary, and vice versa. Enantiomers rotate plane-polarized light the same number of degrees, but in opposite directions.

=== Chirality prefixes ===
A compound may be labeled as dextrorotary by using the "(+)-" or "d-" prefix. Likewise, a levorotary compound may be labeled using the "(−)-" or "l-" prefix. The International Union of Pure and Applied Chemistry, the authority on chemical nomenclature, strongly discourages use of the "d-" and "l-" prefixes. The lowercase "d-" and "l-" prefixes are distinct from the SMALL CAPS "D-" and "L-" prefixes. The "D-" and "L-" prefixes are used to specify the enantiomer of chiral organic compounds in biochemistry and are based on the compound's absolute configuration relative to (+)-glyceraldehyde, which is the D-form by definition.

The prefix used to indicate absolute configuration is not directly related to the (+) or (−) prefix used to indicate optical rotation in the same molecule. For example, nine of the nineteen L-amino acids naturally occurring in proteins are, despite the L- prefix, actually dextrorotary (at a wavelength of 589 nm), and D-fructose is sometimes called "levulose" because it is levorotary. The two naming systems can be combined to indicate both absolute configuration and optical rotation, as in D-(+)-glyceraldehyde.

The D- and L- prefixes describe the molecule as a whole, as do the (+) and (−) prefixes for optical rotation. In contrast, the (R)- and (S)- prefixes from the Cahn–Ingold–Prelog priority rules characterize the absolute configuration of each specific chiral stereocenter with the molecule, rather than a property of the molecule as a whole. A molecule having exactly one chiral stereocenter (usually an asymmetric carbon atom) can be labeled (R) or (S), but a molecule having multiple stereocenters needs more than one label. For example, the essential amino acid L-threonine contains two chiral stereocenters and is written (2S,3S)-threonine. There is no strict relationship between the R/S, the D/L, and (+)/(−) designations, although some correlations exist. For example, of the naturally occurring amino acids, all are L, and most are (S). For some molecules the (R)-enantiomer is the dextrorotary (+) enantiomer, and in other cases it is the levorotary (−) enantiomer. The relationship must be determined on a case-by-case basis with experimental measurements or detailed computer modeling.

== History ==
The two asymmetric crystal forms, dextrorotatory and levorotatory, of tartaric acid.

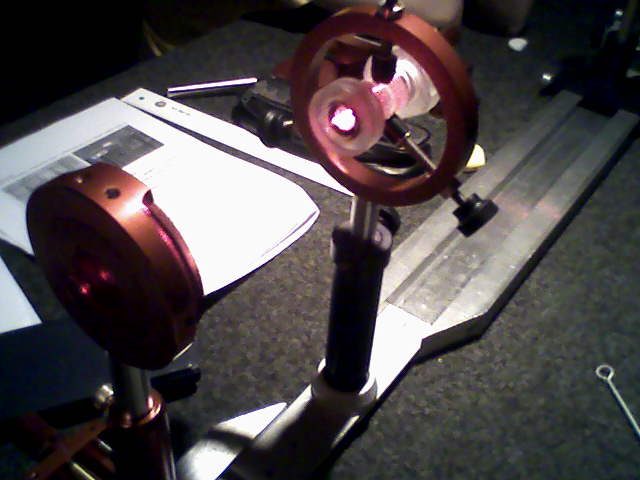
Sucrose solution concentration measuring experiment, demonstrating optical rotation.

The rotation of the orientation of linearly polarized light was first observed in 1811 in quartz by French physicist François Arago. In 1820, the English astronomer Sir John F.W. Herschel discovered that different individual quartz crystals, whose crystalline structures are mirror images of each other (see illustration), rotate linear polarization by equal amounts but in opposite directions. Jean Baptiste Biot also observed the rotation of the axis of polarization in certain liquids and vapors of organic substances such as turpentine. In 1822, Augustin-Jean Fresnel found that optical rotation could be explained as a species of birefringence: whereas previously known cases of birefringence were due to the different speeds of light polarized in two perpendicular planes, optical rotation was due to the different speeds of right-hand and left-hand circularly polarized light. Simple polarimeters have been used since this time to measure the concentrations of simple sugars, such as glucose, in solution. In fact one name for D-glucose (the biological isomer), is dextrose, referring to the fact that it causes linearly polarized light to rotate to the right or dexter side. In a similar manner, levulose, more commonly known as fructose, causes the plane of polarization to rotate to the left. Fructose is even more strongly levorotatory than glucose is dextrorotatory. Invert sugar syrup, commercially formed by the hydrolysis of sucrose syrup to a mixture of the component simple sugars, fructose, and glucose, gets its name from the fact that the conversion causes the direction of rotation to "invert" from right to left.

In 1849, Louis Pasteur resolved a problem concerning the nature of tartaric acid. A solution of this compound derived from living things (to be specific, wine lees) rotates the plane of polarization of light passing through it, but tartaric acid derived by chemical synthesis has no such effect, even though its reactions are identical and its elemental composition is the same. Pasteur noticed that crystals of this compound come in two asymmetric forms that are mirror images of one another. Sorting the crystals by hand gave two forms of the compound: Solutions of one form rotate polarized light clockwise, while the other form rotate light counterclockwise. An equal mix of the two has no polarizing effect on light. Pasteur deduced that the molecule in question is asymmetric and could exist in two different forms that resemble one another as would left- and right-hand gloves, and that the organic form of the compound consists of purely the one type.

In 1874, Jacobus Henricus van 't Hoff and Joseph Achille Le Bel independently proposed that this phenomenon of optical activity in carbon compounds could be explained by assuming that the 4 saturated chemical bonds between carbon atoms and their neighbors are directed towards the corners of a regular tetrahedron. If the 4 neighbors are all different, then there are two possible orderings of the neighbors around the tetrahedron, which will be mirror images of each other. This led to a better understanding of the three-dimensional nature of molecules.

In 1898, Jagadish Chandra Bose described the ability of twisted artificial structures to rotate the polarization of microwaves. In 1914, Karl F. Lindman showed the same effect for an artificial composite consisting of randomly-dispersed left- or right-handed wire helices in cotton. Since the early 21st century, the development of artificial materials has led to the prediction and realization of chiral metamaterials with optical activity exceeding that of natural media by orders of magnitude in the optical part of the spectrum. Extrinsic chirality associated with oblique illumination of metasurfaces lacking two-fold rotational symmetry has been observed to lead to large linear optical activity in transmission and reflection, as well as nonlinear optical activity exceeding that of lithium iodate by 30 million times.

In 1945, Charles William Bunn predicted optical activity of achiral structures, if the wave's propagation direction and the achiral structure form an experimental arrangement that is different from its mirror image. Such optical activity due to extrinsic chirality was observed in the 1960s in liquid crystals.

In 1950, Sergey Vavilov predicted optical activity that depends on the intensity of light and the effect of nonlinear optical activity was observed in 1979 in lithium iodate crystals.

Optical activity is normally observed for transmitted light. However, in 1988, M. P. Silverman discovered that polarization rotation can also occur for light reflected from chiral substances. Shortly after, it was observed that chiral media can also reflect left-handed and right-handed circularly polarized waves with different efficiencies. These phenomena of specular circular birefringence and specular circular dichroism are jointly known as specular optical activity. Specular optical activity is very weak in natural materials.

== Theory ==
Optical activity occurs due to molecules dissolved in a fluid or due to the fluid itself only if the molecules are one of two (or more) stereoisomers; this is known as an enantiomer. The structure of such a molecule is such that it is not identical to its mirror image (which would be that of a different stereoisomer, or the "opposite enantiomer"). In mathematics, this property is also known as chirality. For instance, a metal rod is not chiral, since its appearance in a mirror is not distinct from itself. However a screw or light bulb base (or any sort of helix) is chiral; an ordinary right-handed screw thread, viewed in a mirror, would appear as a left-handed screw (very uncommon) which could not possibly screw into an ordinary (right-handed) nut. A human viewed in a mirror would have their heart on the right side, clear evidence of chirality, whereas the mirror reflection of a doll might well be indistinguishable from the doll itself.

In order to display optical activity, a fluid must contain only one, or a preponderance of one, stereoisomer. If two enantiomers are present in equal proportions, then their effects cancel out and no optical activity is observed; this is termed a racemic mixture. But when there is an enantiomeric excess, more of one enantiomer than the other, the cancellation is incomplete and optical activity is observed. Many naturally occurring molecules are present as only one enantiomer (such as many sugars). Chiral molecules produced within the fields of organic chemistry or inorganic chemistry are racemic unless a chiral reagent was employed in the same reaction.

At the fundamental level, polarization rotation in an optically active medium is caused by circular birefringence, and can best be understood in that way. Whereas linear birefringence in a crystal involves a small difference in the phase velocity of light of two different linear polarizations, circular birefringence implies a small difference in the velocities between right and left-handed circular polarizations. Think of one enantiomer in a solution as a large number of little helices (or screws), all right-handed, but in random orientations. Birefringence of this sort is possible even in a fluid because the handedness of the helices is not dependent on their orientation: even when the direction of one helix is reversed, it still appears right handed. And circularly polarized light itself is chiral: as the wave proceeds in one direction the electric (and magnetic) fields composing it are rotating clockwise (or counterclockwise for the opposite circular polarization), tracing out a right (or left) handed screw pattern in space. In addition to the bulk refractive index which substantially lowers the phase velocity of light in any dielectric (transparent) material compared to the speed of light (in vacuum), there is an additional interaction between the chirality of the wave and the chirality of the molecules. Where their chiralities are the same, there will be a small additional effect on the wave's velocity, but the opposite circular polarization will experience an opposite small effect as its chirality is opposite that of the molecules.

Unlike linear birefringence, however, natural optical rotation (in the absence of a magnetic field) cannot be explained in terms of a local material permittivity tensor (i.e., a charge response that only depends on the local electric field vector), as symmetry considerations forbid this. Rather, circular birefringence only appears when considering nonlocality of the material response, a phenomenon known as spatial dispersion. Nonlocality means that electric fields in one location of the material drive currents in another location of the material. Light travels at a finite speed, and even though it is much faster than the electrons, it makes a difference whether the charge response naturally wants to travel along with the electromagnetic wavefront, or opposite to it. Spatial dispersion means that light travelling in different directions (different wavevectors) sees a slightly different permittivity tensor. Natural optical rotation requires a special material, but it also relies on the fact that the wavevector of light is nonzero, and a nonzero wavevector bypasses the symmetry restrictions on the local (zero-wavevector) response. However, there is still reversal symmetry, which is why the direction of natural optical rotation must be 'reversed' when the direction of the light is reversed, in contrast to magnetic Faraday rotation. All optical phenomena have some nonlocality/wavevector influence but it is usually negligible; natural optical rotation, rather uniquely, absolutely requires it.

The phase velocity of light in a medium is commonly expressed using the index of refraction n, defined as the speed of light (in free space) divided by its speed in the medium. The difference in the refractive indices between the two circular polarizations quantifies the strength of the circular birefringence (polarization rotation),

$$\Delta n = n_\text{RHC} - n_\text{LHC}.$$

While $\Delta n$ is small in natural materials, examples of giant circular birefringence resulting in a negative refractive index for one circular polarization have been reported for chiral metamaterials.

The familiar rotation of the axis of linear polarization relies on the understanding that a linearly polarized wave can as well be described as the superposition (addition) of a left and right circularly polarized wave in equal proportion. The phase difference between these two waves is dependent on the orientation of the linear polarization which we'll call $\theta_0$, and their electric fields have a relative phase difference of $2\theta_0$ which then add to produce linear polarization:

$$\mathbf{E}_{\theta_0} = \frac{\sqrt{2}}{2} \big(e^{-i\theta_0} \mathbf{E}_\text{RHC} + e^{i\theta_0} \mathbf{E}_\text{LHC}\big),$$

where $\mathbf{E}_{\theta_0}$ is the electric field of the net wave, while $\mathbf{E}_\text{RHC}$ and $\mathbf{E}_\text{LHC}$ are the two circularly polarized basis functions (having zero phase difference). Assuming propagation in the +z direction, we could write $\mathbf{E}_\text{RHC}$ and $\mathbf{E}_\text{LHC}$ in terms of their x and y components as follows:

$$\mathbf{E}_\text{RHC} = \frac{\sqrt{2}}{2} (\hat{x} + i \hat{y}),$$
$$\mathbf{E}_\text{LHC} = \frac{\sqrt{2}}{2} (\hat{x} - i \hat{y}),$$

where $\hat{x}$ and $\hat{y}$ are unit vectors, and i is the imaginary unit, in this case representing the 90-degree phase shift between the x and y components that we have decomposed each circular polarization into. As usual when dealing with phasor notation, it is understood that such quantities are to be multiplied by $e^{-i\omega t}$ and then the actual electric field at any instant is given by the real part of that product.

Substituting these expressions for $\mathbf{E}_\text{RHC}$ and $\mathbf{E}_\text{LHC}$ into the equation for $\mathbf{E}_{\theta_0},$ we obtain

$$\begin{align}
\mathbf{E}_{\theta_0} &= \frac{\sqrt{2}}{2} \big(e^{-i\theta_0} \mathbf{E}_\text{RHC} + e^{i\theta_0} \mathbf{E}_\text{LHC}\big) \\
&= \frac{1}{2} \big[\hat{x} \big(e^{-i\theta_0} + e^{i\theta_0}\big) + \hat{y} i \big(e^{-i\theta_0} - e^{i\theta_0}\big)\big] \\
&= \hat{x} \cos\theta_0 + \hat{y} \sin\theta_0.
\end{align}$$

The last equation shows that the resulting vector has the x and y components in phase and oriented exactly in the $\theta_0$ direction, as we had intended, justifying the representation of any linearly polarized state at angle $\theta$ as the superposition of right and left circularly polarized components with a relative phase difference of $2\theta$. Now let us assume transmission through an optically active material which induces an additional phase difference between the right and left circularly polarized waves of $2\Delta \theta$. Let us call $\mathbf{E}_\text{out}$ the result of passing the original wave linearly polarized at angle $\theta$ through this medium. This will apply additional phase factors of $-\Delta \theta$ and $\Delta \theta$ to the right and left circularly polarized components of $\mathbf{E}_{\theta_0}$:

$$\mathbf{E}_\text{out} = \frac{\sqrt{2}}{2} \big(e^{-i\Delta\theta} e^{-i\theta_0} \mathbf{E}_\text{RHC} + e^{i\Delta\theta} e^{i\theta_0} \mathbf{E}_\text{LHC}\big).$$

Using similar math as above, we find

$$\mathbf{E}_\text{out} = \hat{x} \cos(\theta_0 + \Delta\theta) + \hat{y} \sin(\theta_0 + \Delta\theta),$$

describing a wave linearly polarized at angle $\theta_0 + \Delta\theta$, thus rotated by $\Delta\theta$ relative to the incoming wave $\mathbf{E}_{\theta_0}.$

We defined above the difference in the refractive indices for right and left circularly polarized waves of $\Delta n$. Considering propagation through a length L in such a material, there will be an additional phase difference induced between them of $2\Delta \theta$ (as we used above) given by

$$2\Delta \theta = \frac{\Delta n L2\pi}{\lambda},$$

where $\lambda$ is the wavelength of the light (in vacuum). This will cause a rotation of the linear axis of polarization by $\Delta \theta$ as we have shown.

In general, the refractive index depends on wavelength (see dispersion) and the differential refractive index $\Delta n$ will also be wavelength dependent. The resulting variation in rotation with the wavelength of the light is called optical rotatory dispersion (ORD). ORD spectra and circular dichroism spectra are related through the Kramers–Kronig relations. Complete knowledge of one spectrum allows the calculation of the other.

So we find that the degree of rotation depends on the color of the light (the yellow sodium D line near 589 nm wavelength is commonly used for measurements) and is directly proportional to the path length $L$ through the substance and the amount of circular birefringence of the material $\Delta n$ which, for a solution, may be computed from the substance's specific rotation and its concentration in solution.

Although optical activity is normally thought of as a property of fluids, particularly aqueous solutions, it has also been observed in crystals such as quartz (SiO_{2}). Although quartz has a substantial linear birefringence, that effect is cancelled when propagation is along the optic axis. In that case, rotation of the plane of polarization is observed due to the relative rotation between crystal planes, thus making the crystal formally chiral as we have defined it above. The rotation of the crystal planes can be right or left-handed, again producing opposite optical activities. On the other hand, amorphous forms of silica such as fused quartz, like a racemic mixture of chiral molecules, has no net optical activity since one or the other crystal structure does not dominate the substance's internal molecular structure.

== Applications ==
For a pure substance in solution, if the color and path length are fixed and the specific rotation is known, the observed rotation can be used to calculate the concentration. This usage makes a polarimeter a tool of great importance to those trading in or using sugar syrups in bulk.

== Comparison to the Faraday effect ==
Rotation of light's plane of polarization may also occur through the Faraday effect, which involves a static magnetic field. However, this is a distinct phenomenon and is not classified as "optical activity". Optical activity is reciprocal, i.e. it is the same for opposite directions of wave propagation through an optically active medium, for example, clockwise polarization rotation from the point of view of an observer. In case of optically active isotropic media, the rotation is the same for any direction of wave propagation. In contrast, the Faraday effect is non-reciprocal, i.e. opposite directions of wave propagation through a Faraday medium will result in clockwise and anti-clockwise polarization rotation from the point of view of an observer. Faraday rotation depends on the propagation direction relative to that of the applied magnetic field. All compounds can exhibit polarization rotation in the presence of an applied magnetic field, provided that (a component of) the magnetic field is oriented in the direction of light propagation. The Faraday effect is one of the first discoveries of the relationship between light and electromagnetic effects.

== See also ==
- Cryptochirality
- Specific rotation
- Circular dichroism
- Birefringence
- Geometric phase
- Polarization
- Chirality (chemistry)
- Chirality (electromagnetism)
- Polarization rotator
- Hyper–Rayleigh scattering
- Raman optical activity (ROA)
- Cotton effect
