= Cryptochirality =

In stereochemistry, cryptochirality is a special case of chirality in which a molecule is chiral but its specific rotation is non-measurable. The underlying reason for the lack of rotation is the specific electronic properties of the molecule. The term was introduced by Kurt Mislow in 1977.

For example, the alkane 5-ethyl-5-propylundecane found in certain species of Phaseolus vulgaris is chiral at its central quaternary carbon, but neither enantiomeric form has any observable optical rotation:

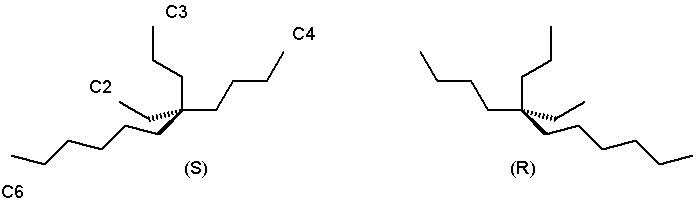
Enantiomers of 5-ethyl-5-propylundecane

It is still possible to distinguish between the two enantiomers by using them in asymmetric synthesis of another chemical whose stereochemical nature can be measured. For example, the Soai reaction of 2-(3,3-dimethylbut-1-ynyl)pyrimidine-5-carbaldehyde with diisopropylzinc performed in the presence of 5-ethyl-5-propylundecane forms a secondary alcohol with a high enantiomeric excess based on the major enantiomer of the alkane that was used.

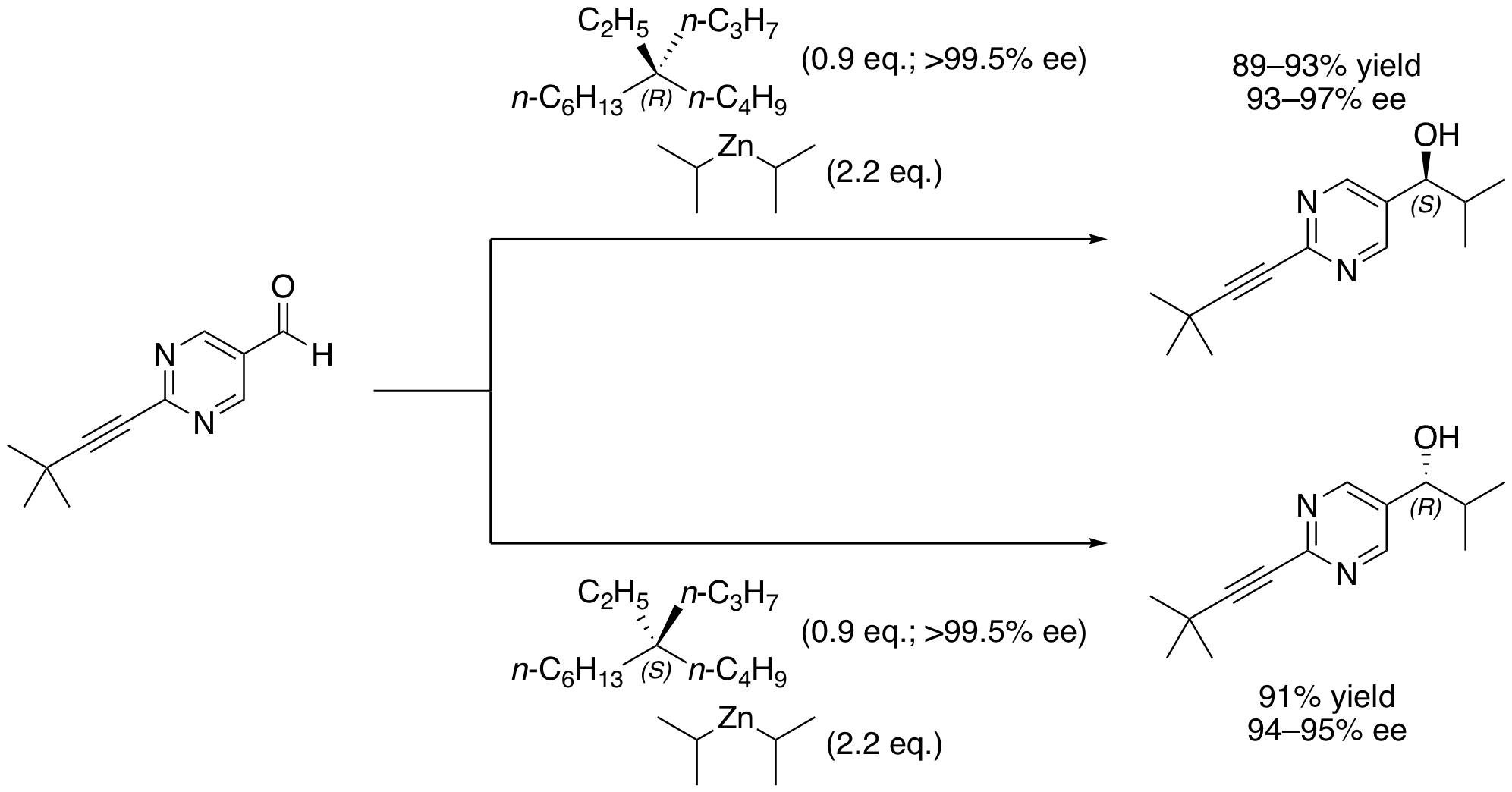

Even a slight enantiomeric excess of the alkane is rapidly amplified due to the autocatalytic nature of this reaction.

Cryptochirality also occurs in polymeric systems growing from chiral initiators, for example in dendrimers having lobes of different sizes attached to a central core.

The term is also used to describe a situation where an enantiomeric excess lies far below the observational horizon, but is still relevant, e.g. in highly enantiosensitive, self-amplifying reactions.

Optical activity is caused by electric fields of light inducing oscillating electron dipoles. This oscillation in charge creates a magnetic field which interacts with the molecule's intrinsic magnetic dipole transition moment. This is called coupling. When the electron cloud is anisotropic the coupling is asymmetric which makes left and right circularly polarized light propagate at different speeds. This causes plane-polarized light to rotate. When the electron cloud is nearly isotropic or dipole oscillations are very small the coupling is symmetric resulting in about the same speed of propagation which results in almost no optical rotation even with a chiral molecule.
