= David L. Andrews =

UK chemical physicist (1952-)

David L. Andrews FInstP FRSC
- Born: October 15, 1952 (age 73)
- Citizenship: United Kingdom
- Education: University College London
- Known for: Theory of optical processes
- Scientific career
- Fields: Chemical Physics
- Workplaces: University of East Anglia
- Thesis: Applications of quantum electrodynamics to light scattering and absorption processes (1976)
- Doctoral advisor: T. Thirunamachandran

David Leslie Andrews, FRSC, FInstP (born 15 October 1952) is a British emeritus professor of Chemical Physics at the University of East Anglia, where he was the Head of Chemical Sciences and Physics from 1996 to 1999.

== Education ==
David Andrews graduated (1st Class Hons) in Chemistry from University College London in 1973. He then obtained a PhD in theoretical chemistry from the same university in 1976.

== Career ==
In 1979, he joined the University of East Anglia as a Lecturer. Andrews was promoted to Senior Lecturer in 1991 and to Reader in 1994. He was appointed Professor of Chemical Physics in 1996 and became Emeritus Professor in 2023.

== Research ==
Andrews and his research group have published on the theory of optical phenomena, developing quantum electrodynamical theory and symmetry principles for applications including fluorescence and optical nanomanipulation. Andrews has worked on the quantum theory of intermolecular energy transfer, including a theory of energy transfer that accommodates both radiationless and radiative processes. He has also contributed to quantum optics and nonlinear optics, with studies of chiral interactions including a prediction of the hyper–Rayleigh scattering effect. Research on chirality and optical helicity have led to contributions to the theory of optical vortices.

== Awards and recognition ==
- 2023: Thomas Young Medal and Prize
- 2022: Faraday Division Horizon Prize
- 2021: President of SPIE
- 2016: Elected Fellow of The Optical Society
- 2005: Elected Fellow of SPIE
- 1999: Elected Fellow of the Institute of Physics
- 1988: Elected Fellow of the Royal Society of Chemistry

== Selected works ==
- Andrews, D.L. (1990). Lasers in Chemistry (second ed.). Berlin, Heidelberg, New York: Springer-Verlag. doi:10.1007/978-3-642-97212-6. ISBN 978-3-642-97212-6.
- Andrews, D.L.; Davies, A.M.C., eds. (1995). Frontiers in Analytical Spectroscopy. Cambridge: Royal Society of Chemistry. ISBN 978-0-854-04730-7. OCLC 473311866.
- Andrews, D.L.; Demidov, A.A., eds. (1999). Resonance Energy Transfer. Chichester, New York, Weinheim: Wiley. ISBN 978-0-471-98732-1.
- Andrews, D.L.; Allcock, P. (2002). Optical Harmonics in Molecular Systems. Weinheim: Wiley VCH. ISBN 978-3-527-60274-2.
- Andrews, D.L.; Gaburro, Z., eds. (2007). Frontiers in Surface Nanophotonics: Principles and Applications. Optical Sciences. Vol. 133 in Springer Series in Optical Sciences. New York: Springer-Verlag. doi:10.1007/978-0-387-48951-3. ISBN 978-0-387-48951-3.
- Andrews, D.L., ed. (2009). Encyclopedia of Applied Spectroscopy. Weinheim: Wiley VCH. ISBN 978-3-527-40773-6. OCLC 751034077.
- Andrews, D.L.; Babiker, M., eds. (2012). The Angular Momentum of Light. Cambridge, New York: Cambridge University Press. doi:10.1017/CBO9780511795213. ISBN 978-0-511-79521-3.
- Andrews, D.L., ed. (2015). Photonics. Vol. 1–4. Hoboken NJ: Wiley. ISBN 978-1-118-22552-3.
- Andrews, D.L.; Nann, T.; Lipson, R.H., eds. (2019). Comprehensive Nanoscience and Nanotechnology. Vol. 1–5 (second ed.). London, Burlington MA, San Diego CA: Academic Press. ISBN 978-0-12-812296-9.
- Al-Amri, M.D.; Andrews, D.L.; Babiker, M., eds. (2021). Structured Light for Optical Communication. Amsterdam: Elsevier. doi:10.1016/C2019-0-00727-3. ISBN 978-0-12-821510-4. S2CID 242131667.
- Andrews, D.L.; Bradshaw, D.S. (2022). Optical Nanomanipulation (second ed.). Bristol: IOP Publishing. doi:10.1088/978-0-7503-4191-2. ISBN 978-0-7503-4189-9. S2CID 247422236.
