= Enantiomeric excess =

How much more of one enantiomer a sample of chiral substance contains

In stereochemistry, enantiomeric excess (ee) is a measurement of purity used for chiral substances. It reflects the degree to which a sample contains one enantiomer in greater amounts than the other. A racemic mixture has an ee of 0%, while a single completely pure enantiomer has an ee of 100%. A sample with 70% of one enantiomer and 30% of the other has an ee of 40% (70% − 30%).

== Definition ==
Enantiomeric excess is defined as the absolute difference between the mole fraction of each enantiomer:

$$\ ee = |F_R - F_S|$$

where

$$\ F_R + F_S = 1$$

In practice, it is most often expressed as a percentage.

Enantiomeric excess is used as one of the indicators of success of an asymmetric synthesis. For mixtures of diastereomers, there is an analogous definition for diastereomeric excess.

For example, a sample with 70% of R isomer and 30% of S has an enantiomeric excess of 40%. This can also be thought of as a mixture of 40% pure R and 60% of a racemic mixture (which contributes 30% R and 30% S to the overall composition).

If given the enantiomeric excess $\ ee$ of a mixture, the fraction of the main isomer, say R, can be determined using $\ F_R = (1+ee)/2$ and the lesser isomer $\ F_S = (1-ee)/2$.

A non-racemic mixture of two enantiomers will have a net optical rotation. It is possible to determine the specific rotation of the mixture and, with knowledge of the specific rotation of the pure enantiomer, the optical purity can be determined.

optical purity = [α]_{obs}/[α]_{max}

Ideally, the contribution of each component of the mixture to the total optical rotation is directly proportional to its mole fraction, and as a result the numerical value of the optical purity is identical to the enantiomeric excess. This has led to informal use the two terms as interchangeable, especially because optical purity was the traditional way of measuring enantiomeric excess. However, other methods such as chiral column chromatography and NMR spectroscopy can now be used for measuring the amount of each enantiomer individually.

The ideal equivalence between enantiomeric excess and optical purity does not always hold. For example,

- the specific rotation of (S)-2-ethyl-2-methyl succinic acid is found to be dependent on concentration
- in what is known as the Horeau effect the relationship between mole based ee and optical rotation based ee can be non-linear i.d. in the succinic acid example the optical activity at 50% ee is lower than expected.
- the specific rotation of enantiopure 1-phenylethanol can be enhanced by the addition of achiral acetophenone as an impurity.

The term enantiomeric excess was introduced in 1971 by Morrison and Mosher in their publication Asymmetric Organic Reactions. The use of enantiomeric excess has established itself because of its historic ties with optical rotation. It has been suggested that the concept of ee should be replaced by that of enantiomeric ratio or er because determination of optical purity has been replaced by other techniques which directly measure R and S and because it simplifies mathematical treatments such as the calculation of equilibrium constants and relative reaction rates. The same arguments are valid for changing diastereomeric excess de to diastereomeric ratio dr.
