= Circular dichroism =

Dichroism with circularly polarized light

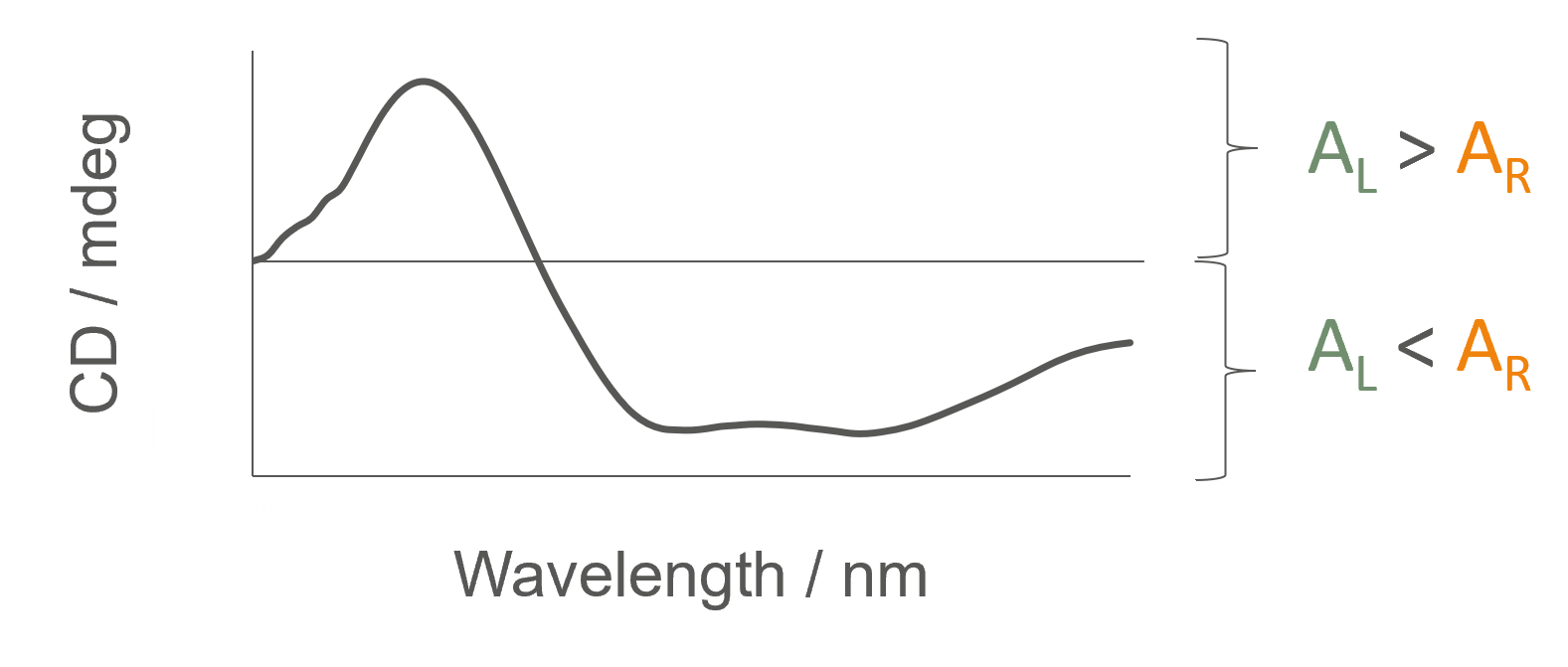
Circular dichroism (CD) is the differential absorption of left- and right-circularly polarized light by a chiral molecule.

Circular dichroism (CD) is dichroism involving circularly polarized light, i.e., the differential absorption of left- and right-handed light. Left-hand circular (LHC) and right-hand circular (RHC) polarized light represent two possible spin angular momentum states for a photon, and so circular dichroism is also referred to as dichroism for spin angular momentum. This phenomenon was discovered by Jean-Baptiste Biot, Augustin Fresnel, and Aimé Cotton in the first half of the 19th century. Circular dichroism and circular birefringence are manifestations of optical activity. It is exhibited in the absorption bands of optically active chiral molecules. CD spectroscopy has a wide range of applications in many different fields. Most notably, far-UV CD is used to investigate the secondary structure of proteins. UV/Vis CD is used to investigate charge-transfer transitions. Near-infrared CD is used to investigate geometric and electronic structure by probing metal d→d transitions. Vibrational circular dichroism, which uses light from the infrared energy region, is used for structural studies of small organic molecules, and most recently proteins and DNA.

== Physical principles ==
=== Circular polarization of light ===
Electromagnetic radiation consists of an electric $\boldsymbol E$ and magnetic $\boldsymbol B$ field that oscillate perpendicular to one another and to the propagating direction, a transverse wave. While linearly polarized light occurs when the electric field vector oscillates only in one plane, circularly polarized light occurs when the direction of the electric field vector rotates about its propagation direction while the vector retains constant magnitude. At a single point in space, the circularly polarized-vector will trace out a circle over one period of the wave frequency, hence the name. The two diagrams below show the electric field vectors of linearly and circularly polarized light, at one moment of time, for a range of positions; the plot of the circularly polarized electric vector forms a helix along the direction of propagation $\boldsymbol k$. For left circularly polarized light (LCP) with propagation towards the observer, the electric vector rotates counterclockwise. For right circularly polarized light (RCP), the electric vector rotates clockwise.

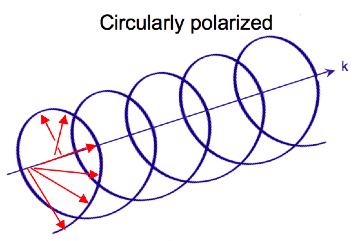

=== Interaction of circularly polarized light with matter ===
When circularly polarized light passes through an absorbing optically active medium, the speeds between right and left polarizations differ ($c_\mathrm{L} \neq c_\mathrm{R}$) as well as their wavelength($\lambda_\mathrm{L} \neq \lambda_\mathrm{R}$) and the extent to which they are absorbed ($\varepsilon_\mathrm{L} \neq \varepsilon_\mathrm{R}$). Circular dichroism is the difference $\Delta\varepsilon \equiv \varepsilon_\mathrm{L} - \varepsilon_\mathrm{R}$. The electric field of a light beam causes a linear displacement of charge when interacting with a molecule (electric dipole), whereas its magnetic field causes a circulation of charge (magnetic dipole). These two motions combined cause an excitation of an electron in a helical motion, which includes translation and rotation and their associated operators. The experimentally determined relationship between the rotational strength $R$ of a sample and the $\Delta\varepsilon$ is given by

$$R_{\mathrm{exp}} = \frac{3hc10^{3} \ln(10)}{32\pi^{3}N_\mathrm{A}} \int \frac{\Delta\varepsilon}{\nu} \mathrm d{\nu}$$

The rotational strength has also been determined theoretically,

$$R_\mathrm{theo} = \frac{1}{2mc} \mathrm{Im} \int \Psi_g \widehat{M}_\mathrm{(elec. dipole)} \Psi_e \mathrm d\tau \bullet \int \Psi_g \widehat{M}_\mathrm{(mag. dipole)} \Psi_e \mathrm d\tau$$

We see from these two equations that in order to have non-zero $\Delta\varepsilon$, the electric and magnetic dipole moment operators ($\widehat{M}_\mathrm{(elec. dipole)}$ and $\widehat{M}_\mathrm{(mag. dipole)}$) must transform as the same irreducible representation. $\mathrm C_n$ and $\mathrm D_n$ are the only point groups where this can occur, making only chiral molecules CD active.

Simply put, since circularly polarized light itself is "chiral", it interacts differently with chiral molecules. That is, the two types of circularly polarized light are absorbed to different extents. In a CD experiment, equal amounts of left and right circularly polarized light of a selected wavelength are alternately radiated into a (chiral) sample. One of the two polarizations is absorbed more than the other one, and this wavelength-dependent difference of absorption is measured, yielding the CD spectrum of the sample. Due to the interaction with the molecule, the electric field vector of the light traces out an elliptical path after passing through the sample.

It is important that the chirality of the molecule can be conformational rather than structural. That is, for instance, a protein molecule with a helical secondary structure can have a CD that changes with changes in the conformation.

==== Delta absorbance ====
By definition,

$$\Delta A=A_\mathrm L-A_\mathrm R \,$$

where $\Delta A$ (Delta Absorbance) is the difference between absorbance of left circularly polarized (LCP) and right circularly polarized (RCP) light (this is what is usually measured). $\Delta A$ is a function of wavelength, so for a measurement to be meaningful the wavelength at which it was performed must be known.

==== Molar circular dichroism ====
It can also be expressed, by applying Beer's law, as:

$$\Delta A = (\varepsilon_\mathrm L - \varepsilon_\mathrm R)Cl\,$$

where

$\varepsilon_\mathrm L$ and $\varepsilon_\mathrm R$ are the molar extinction coefficients for LCP and RCP light,
$C$ is the molar concentration,
$l$ is the path length in centimeters (cm).

Then

$$\Delta \varepsilon =\varepsilon_\mathrm L-\varepsilon_\mathrm R\,$$

is the molar circular dichroism. This intrinsic property is what is usually meant by the circular dichroism of the substance. Since $\Delta \varepsilon$ is a function of wavelength, a molar circular dichroism value ($\Delta \varepsilon$) must specify the wavelength at which it is valid.

==== Extrinsic effects on circular dichroism ====
In many practical applications of circular dichroism (CD), as discussed below, the measured CD is not simply an intrinsic property of the molecule, but rather depends on the molecular conformation. In such a case the CD may also be a function of temperature, concentration, and the chemical environment, including solvents. In this case the reported CD value must also specify these other relevant factors in order to be meaningful.

In ordered structures lacking two-fold rotational symmetry, optical activity, including differential transmission (and reflection) of circularly polarized waves also depends on the propagation direction through the material. In this case, so-called extrinsic 3d chirality is associated with the mutual orientation of light beam and structure.

==== Molar ellipticity ====
Although $\Delta A$ is usually measured, for historical reasons most measurements are reported in degrees of ellipticity. Molar ellipticity is circular dichroism corrected for concentration. Molar circular dichroism and molar ellipticity, $[\theta]$, are readily interconverted by the equation:

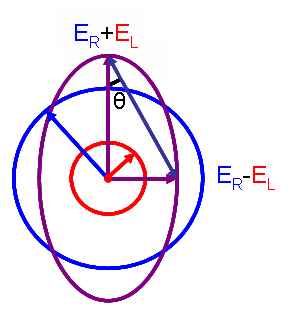
Elliptical polarized light (violet) is composed of unequal contributions of right (blue) and left (red) circular polarized light.

$$[\theta] = 3298.2\,\Delta \varepsilon.\,$$

This relationship is derived by defining the ellipticity of the polarization as:

$$\tan \theta = \frac{E_\mathrm R - E_\mathrm L}{E_\mathrm R + E_\mathrm L} \,$$

where

$E_\mathrm R$ and $E_\mathrm L$ are the magnitudes of the electric field vectors of the right-circularly and left-circularly polarized light, respectively.

When $E_\mathrm R$ equals $E_\mathrm L$ (when there is no difference in the absorbance of right- and left-circular polarized light), $\theta$ is 0° and the light is linearly polarized. When either $E_\mathrm R$ or $E_\mathrm L$ is equal to zero (when there is complete absorbance of the circular polarized light in one direction), $\theta$ is 45° and the light is circularly polarized.

Generally, the circular dichroism effect is small, so $\tan\theta$ is small and can be approximated as $\theta$ in radians. Since the intensity or irradiance, $I$, of light is proportional to the square of the electric-field vector, the ellipticity becomes:

$$\theta (\text{radians}) = \frac{(I_\mathrm R^{1/2} - I_\mathrm L^{1/2})}{(I_\mathrm R^{1/2} + I_\mathrm L^{1/2})}\,$$

Then by substituting for I using Beer's law in natural logarithm form:

$$I = I_0 \mathrm e^{-A\ln 10}\,$$

The ellipticity can now be written as:

$$\theta (\text{radians}) = \frac{(\mathrm e^{\frac{-A_\mathrm R}{2}\ln 10} - \mathrm e^{\frac{-A_\mathrm L}{2}\ln 10})}{(\mathrm e^{\frac{-A_\mathrm R}{2}\ln 10} + \mathrm e^{\frac{-A_\mathrm L}{2}\ln 10})} = \frac{\mathrm e^{\Delta A \frac{\ln 10}{2}} - 1}{\mathrm e^{\Delta A \frac{\ln 10}{2}} + 1} \,$$

Since $\Delta A \ll 1$, this expression can be approximated by expanding the exponentials in a Taylor series to first-order and then discarding terms of $\Delta A$ in comparison with unity and converting from radians to degrees:

$$\theta (\text{degrees}) = \Delta A \left( \frac {\ln 10}{4} \right) \left( \frac {180}{\pi} \right)\,$$

The linear dependence of solute concentration and pathlength is removed by defining molar ellipticity as,

$$[\theta] = \frac {100\theta}{Cl}\,$$

Then combining the last two expression with Beer's law, molar ellipticity becomes:

$$[\theta]= 100 \,\Delta \varepsilon \left( \frac {\ln 10}{4} \right) \left( \frac {180}{\pi} \right) = 3298.2\,\Delta \varepsilon \,$$

The units of molar ellipticity are historically (deg·cm^{2}/dmol). To calculate molar ellipticity, the sample concentration (g/L), cell pathlength (cm), and the molecular weight (g/mol) must be known.

If the sample is a protein, the mean residue weight (average molecular weight of the amino acid residues it contains) is often used in place of the molecular weight, essentially treating the protein as a solution of amino acids. Using mean residue ellipticity facilitates comparing the CD of proteins of different molecular weight; use of this normalized CD is important in studies of protein structure.

==== Mean residue ellipticity ====
Methods for estimating secondary structure in polymers, proteins and polypeptides in particular, often require that the measured molar ellipticity spectrum be converted to a normalized value, specifically a value independent of the polymer length. Mean residue ellipticity is used for this purpose; it is simply the measured molar ellipticity of the molecule divided by the number of monomer units (residues) in the molecule.

== Application to biological molecules ==
Upper panel: Circular dichroism spectroscopy in the far-ultraviolet wavelength region (far-UV CD) of MBP-cytochrome b_{6} fusion protein in different detergent solutions. It shows that the protein in DM, as well as in Triton X-100 solution, recovered its structure. However the spectra obtained from SDS solution shows decreased ellipticity in the range between 200 and 210 nm, which indicates incomplete secondary structure recovery. Lower panel: The content of secondary structures predicted from the CD spectra using the CDSSTR algorithm. The protein in SDS solution shows increased content of unordered structures and decreased helices content.

Circular Dichroism (CD) spectroscopy is a powerful tool in biophysical and biochemical research, providing unique insights into the structural and stability characteristics of biomolecules. Because CD arises from the differential absorption of left- and right-circularly polarized light by optically active molecules, it is inherently sensitive to the chiral nature of biological macromolecules. This makes it particularly valuable for analyzing secondary structures, as seen in the characteristic CD spectral signatures of the α-helices and β-sheets of proteins and the double helices of nucleic acids. While high-resolution techniques such as X-ray crystallography, NMR, and cryo-EM reveal atomic-level structural details, and interaction-based methods like ITC and SPR probe molecular interactions, CD spectroscopy offers a rapid, label-free means of detecting structural changes and stability shifts. Its ability to provide complementary data makes it an essential component of the modern biophysical toolbox, with applications spanning virtually every field of biomolecular research. CD spectroscopy is widely used in academia and the biopharmaceutical industry to study biomolecules, particularly proteins and peptides. CD spectra provide valuable insights into both secondary and tertiary structure.

Secondary structure information is derived from signals arising from peptide bonds that absorb in the far-UV range (spanning approximately 180 nm to 260 nm), enabling the identification and fractional assignments of structural elements such as the alpha-helix, beta-sheet, beta-turn, and random coil. These structural assignments place important constraints on the possible secondary conformations that the protein can be in. CD cannot, in general, say where the alpha helices that are detected are located within the molecule or even completely predict how many there are. Despite this, CD is a valuable tool, especially for showing changes in conformation. It can, for instance, be used to study how the secondary structure of a molecule changes as a function of temperature (in a thermal denaturation temperature ramp experiment) or of the concentration of denaturing agents (in a chemical denaturation experiment), e.g. guanidinium chloride or urea. In this way it can reveal important thermodynamic information about the molecule (such as the enthalpy and Gibbs free energy of denaturation) that cannot otherwise be easily obtained. Anyone attempting to study a protein will find CD a valuable tool for verifying that the protein is in its native conformation (i.e., as a quality control technique) before undertaking extensive and/or expensive experiments with it. Moreover, CD spectroscopy has been used in bioinorganic interface studies; specifically, it has been used to analyze the differences in secondary structure of an engineered protein before and after titration with a reagent.

Insight into tertiary structure is obtained from spectral contributions of aromatic amino acids, which absorb in the near-UV range (spanning approximately 250 nm to 350 nm). The signals obtained in this region are due to the absorption, dipole orientation, and nature of the surrounding environment of the phenylalanine, tyrosine, cysteine (or S-S disulfide bridges) and tryptophan amino acids. Unlike in far-UV CD, the near-UV CD spectrum cannot be assigned to any particular 3D structure. Rather, the near-UV range can be considered a fingerprint region because its spectral profile is exquisitely dependent on the composition of aromatic residues and the conformation and environment of their side chains.

Visible CD spectra (spanning approximately 350 nm to 700 nm) provide structural information on the nature of the prosthetic groups in proteins, e.g., the heme groups in hemoglobin and cytochrome c. Visible CD spectroscopy is a very powerful technique to study metal–protein interactions and can resolve individual d–d electronic transitions as separate bands. CD spectra in the visible light region are generally only produced when a metal ion is in a chiral environment, thus, free metal ions in solution are not detected. This has the advantage of only observing the protein-bound metal, so pH dependence and stoichiometries are readily obtained. Optical activity in transition metal ion complexes have been attributed to configurational, conformational, and vicinal effects. Klewpatinond and Viles (2007) have produced a set of empirical rules for predicting the appearance of visible CD spectra for Cu(II) and Ni(II) square-planar complexes involving histidine and main-chain coordination.

Beyond proteins and peptides, UV-CD spectroscopy is a powerful tool for characterizing the secondary structure of nucleic acids, providing insight into DNA helices and RNA structural motifs such as G-quadruplexes. Different DNA conformations—A-DNA, B-DNA, and Z-DNA—exhibit distinct CD spectral signatures due to variations in base stacking and helical geometry. Similarly, RNA structures, including stem-loops, pseudoknots, and G-quadruplexes, produce unique CD spectra that reflect their specific folding patterns and base interactions. G-quadruplexes, in particular, show characteristic positive and negative bands in the CD spectrum depending on their topology (parallel, antiparallel, or hybrid). These spectral features make UV-CD an essential technique for studying nucleic acid folding, stability, and interactions with ligands.

CD gives less specific structural information than X-ray crystallography and protein NMR spectroscopy, for example, which both give atomic resolution data. However, CD spectroscopy is a quick method that does not require large amounts of proteins or extensive data processing. Thus CD can be used to survey many solvent conditions, varying temperature, pH, salinity, and the presence of various cofactors.

CD spectroscopy is usually used to study proteins in solution, and thus it complements methods that study the solid state. This is also a limitation, in that many proteins are embedded in membranes in their native state, and solutions containing membrane structures are often strongly scattering. CD can also be measured in thin films and powders. For instance, CD spectroscopy has been conducted on solid state semiconducting materials such as TiO_{2} to obtain large signals in the UV wavelength range, where the electronic transitions for biomolecules often occur.

== Higher order structure comparisons ==
Modern protein CD spectroscopy is most powerful for comparative analysis of secondary and tertiary structure, commonly referred to as higher order structure (HOS) comparisons. Examples include assessing batch-to-batch consistency in biotherapeutics, evaluating the effects of mutations, and studying the properties of charge variants or glycovariants to a parent protein. HOS analysis is also highly effective for studying the impact of formulation excipients, pH, and ionic strength on protein conformation.

HOS comparisons have a wide range of applications and play a critical role at every stage of biotherapeutic development—from early-stage analytical assessments to late-stage quality control; from formulation development to forced degradation shelf stability assessments.

Higher order structure comparisons leverage both far- and near-UV wavelength ranges to enable statistically robust, reproducible, and quantifiable data analysis. An HOS comparison quantitatively evaluates whether any two spectra differ and, by extension, whether their underlying structural information is different. This is often difficult, if not impossible, to do by visual inspection. Detecting these subtle differences requires multiple independent spectra and robust statistical analysis, as many variations are too small to be discernible by eye.

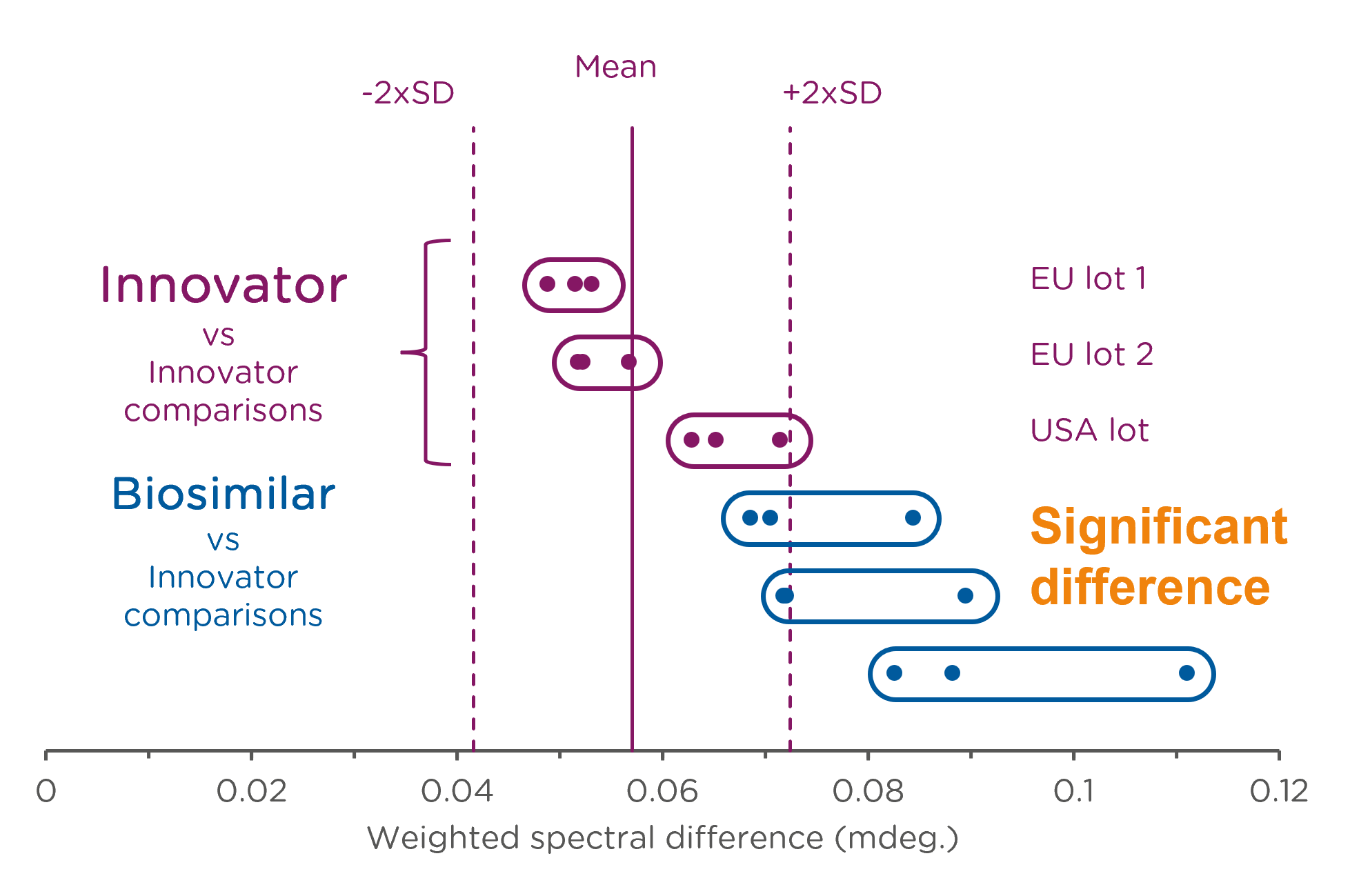
Weighted Spectral Difference (WSD) plot comparing Innovator versus Biosimilar sample lots. If the WSD values for enough sample replicates fall within the quality range, the sample is considered similar to the reference; otherwise, it is deemed different.

There are various approaches to HOS comparisons and numerous spectral comparison methods are described in the literature, however, regardless of the HOS comparison method or application, all methods are mathematical approaches that have the same goal of yielding a single value as a measure of similarity for pair-wise spectral comparisons. One such method is the Weighted Spectral Difference (WSD) method, an HOS comparison method favored by many biopharmaceutical companies and regulatory authorities.

Over the last decade, HOS comparisons have been established as an essential tool to consolidate CD data in submissions for new biologics drug applications. Particularly in biosimilars development, HOS comparisons are indispensable to meet requirements by the FDA, EMA, and other regulatory bodies. The rationale for this guidance is to regulate and control the safety, quality, and efficacy of therapeutic agents available to the public.

== Additional applications and related techniques ==
=== Fluorescence ===
Fluorescence measurements in CD spectroscopy, recorded at a 90 degree angle to the incident light, often serve as a complementary data channel, providing additional insights into protein stability and conformational changes. By detecting intrinsic fluorescence from aromatic residues such as tryptophan and tyrosine, researchers can assess environmental shifts that accompany structural transitions. Fluorescence data can be acquired alongside CD signals, particularly in temperature ramp experiments, where it helps monitor unfolding events by tracking changes in emission intensity or wavelength shifts. This process could be followed by recording CD spectra at intervals of 1 °C, for example, while increasing the temperature continuously at 1 °C per minute. The excitation bandwidth required for the fluorescence spectra is usually larger than what would be used as spectral bandwidth for CD measurements, so sometimes the use of different spectral bandwidths for CD and fluorescence measurements is necessary. This dual approach enhances the interpretation of protein behavior under varying conditions, improving confidence in structural and stability assessments.

There are multiple approaches to collecting fluorescence data, including the use of a photomultiplier tube (PMT) to record total fluorescence, the use of a CCD fluorometer to record full-spectrum fluorescence, or the use of a scanning emission monochromator (SEM) to allow for scanning the fluorescence spectrum at a fixed excitation wavelength.

=== Optical rotatory dispersion (ORD) ===
CD is closely related to the technique of optical rotatory dispersion (ORD). Optical rotation is the rotation of linearly polarized light as a result of it passing through an optically active material, and is a consequence of a difference in refractive index between the left and right circularly polarized components of the light (linearly polarized light can be considered to be an equal combination of right and left circularly polarized light). Optical rotatory dispersion is the variation in optical rotation with wavelength. ORD and CD spectra both derive from the interaction of polarized (circularly or linearly) light with chiral molecules and are directly related: each can be derived from the other using the Kramers-Kronig transform. Measurements of ORD and CD give essentially the same information, but experimentally each technique has been favored for particular applications. CD is the higher resolution technique since it is only observed at wavelengths where the chiral molecule absorbs light. This makes complicated spectra involving multiple absorbance bands easier to interpret. Alternatively, ORD measurements can be obtained at wavelengths where the chiral molecule being measured does not necessarily absorb light. This means that ORD measurements can be made on materials with high concentrations or where absorbance bands are obscured by solvent or buffer salt absorbance. ORD is particularly useful for unsubstituted sugars as this class of biomolecule does not possess chromophores that absorb in the UV-Vis regions accessible via commercial CD instruments.

=== Linear dichroism (LD) ===
With the appropriate accessory, it is possible to perform linear dichroism (LD) measurements on CD spectrophotometers. Linear dichroism is the difference in the absorbance of light polarized parallel and perpendicular to an orientation axis:

ΔA = A_{para} - A_{perp}

where A is the absorbance of the linearly polarized light, and the subscripts indicate parallel and perpendicular, respectively. For a sample to have non-zero LD it must be anisotropic; the anisotropy may be intrinsic, as in liquid crystals for example, or it may be induced, for example, by stretching a polymer film, by the application of an electrical field, or by alignment or deformation in a shear field (e.g., nucleic acids such as DNA).

An LD device uses a Couette cell to generate a shear field. The sample is contained in the annular gap between two concentric quartz cylinders, the outer of which, the rotor, is rotated about its cylindrical axis, while the inner, the stator, is stationary. This arrangement is named after its originator, Maurice Couette.

Shearing can cause large particles in the liquid to align or deform. For example, rigid, rod-like particles, such as carbon nanotubes and glass fibers, will align, whereas vesicles, micelles, and flexible polymers will deform from their equilibrium conformations, extending in the direction of shear. Linear dichroism is then used to determine the direction of net electron transfer in an absorbed chromophore relative to the shear direction, and thereby to the alignment direction of the absorbing species or the deformation direction of its environment.

For more information on LD and its measurement, consult this book.

=== Magnetic circular dichroism (MCD) ===
Magnetic circular dichroism (MCD) is the differential absorption of left and right circularly polarized light in the presence of a magnetic field oriented parallel to the direction of light propagation. MCD differs from natural CD in that it does not require a chiral sample; the origins of CD and MCD are quite different.

There are three contributions to an MCD spectrum, known as the A-, B-, and C-terms. At room temperature, the A- and B-terms dominate, especially for non-magnetic chromophores, and form the majority of what can be observed in a standard MCD experiment.

The A-term is due to Zeeman splitting of degenerate excited states by a difference in spin. The result is a small shift apart in the wavelengths of the UV-Visible spectrum for each spin state, with each state preferentially absorbing left or right circularly polarized light. The A-term MCD spectrum is observed as a derivative of an absorbance transition with a sharp transition around the absorbance peak. Because of the A-term bands, the MCD spectrum is more structured than the absorbance or natural CD spectrum, multiple overlapping chromophores can be quantified much more easily, and changes in individual chromophores can be tracked.

The B-term is due to mixing of non-degenerate ground states. It is normally observed as a single absorption band type peak, which may be either positive or negative.

The C-term is due to changes in populations of molecules over the Zeeman sublevels due to the response to the field of a paramagnetic ground state. They become significant in the MCD spectrum only at very low temperatures, and the instrumentation requirements of high field strengths and cryogenic temperatures are very similar to those of the related technique of electron paramagnetic resonance (EPR). This is an expensive and dedicated system, and access to the C-terms is therefore beyond the scope of an easily interchangeable MCD accessory on a benchtop CD instrument.

Collection of MCD data is similar to that of natural CD, except that there are two possible orientations of the magnet, with either the north or south pole closer to the detector. Normally a spectrum is acquired with the magnet in each orientation; since the MCD contribution to the spectrum changes sign when the magnetic field is reversed, whereas the natural CD contribution does not, both contributions can be obtained by averaging the two spectra.

For further information on MCD see this book.

=== Circularly polarized luminescence (CPL) ===
Circularly polarized luminescence (CPL) is the emission analog of CD. While CD examines the geometry of molecules in their ground state, CPL, typically observed perpendicular to the incident light beam, provides insight into the geometry of molecules in their excited or luminescent state. In a CPL experiment, the emitted light is analyzed for its contents of left and right circularly polarized light.

The difference in intensity between left and right circularly polarized emitted light, ΔI, is given by:

ΔI = I_{L} – I_{R}

where I_{L} and I_{R} are the intensity of left and right circularly polarized emitted light, respectively. The average luminescence intensity is given by:

I = (I_{L} + I_{R}) / 2

Both ΔI and I are in relative units because in luminescence experiments not all the luminescent light is detected, only that in a restricted solid angle. Moreover, an absolute value for the concentration of luminescent molecules may be hard to obtain. For these reasons, a dissymmetry factor in the luminescence is defined as:

g_{lum} = ΔI / I

with g_{lum} being an absolute number that is unique to each CPL-active molecule under specific conditions.

Many commercially available CD spectrophotometers can be adapted with an accessory to measure the circularly polarized luminescence of a sample.

=== Analysis of solid samples ===
It is possible to analyze solid-state samples by CD spectroscopy. There are a few options to accomplish this.

Samples are often prepared in the form of discs, either by compression with an inert dispersant such as potassium bromide or potassium chloride or by deposition of the sample as a thin film on top of the disc. This technique is well established in IR absorbance spectroscopy, and it has also been used in UV/visible spectroscopy. The sample is measured in transmission mode, with the light passing through the sample to a detector mounted in the spectrometer transmission port. To eliminate the effect of anisotropy, the sample is usually mounted in a wheel and can be manually rotated to allow measurements to be made at several angular positions. The spectra of all positions can then be averaged.

If the solid samples exist in the form of a powder, they can be measured via diffuse reflectance by using a device known as an integrating sphere.

Integrating spheres were developed early in the twentieth century and were originally used to measure the total output of a light source without reference to the original direction of the light. They are now commonly used when measuring the UV/visible or IR absorption spectra of solid samples, and their use can be extended to the UV/visible CD spectroscopy of solids.

Light enters the sphere through an inlet port, and the internal surfaces of the sphere are usually white, reflective, and diffuse, so that the light becomes equally distributed within the sphere through multiple scattering reflections. A detector is placed at an outlet port and the intensity of the light is measured. For CD spectroscopy, the sample can be placed either at the inlet port, so that the light passes through it before entering the sphere, or at a point on the sphere opposite the inlet port, so that light is diffusely reflected from the sample after entering the sphere. These two operating modes are called transmission and diffuse reflectance, respectively. In both cases the sample is prepared in powder form. For transmission mode, it must then be dispersed in either potassium bromide or potassium chloride and compressed into a disc. For diffuse reflectance mode, it remains as a free powder, if necessary dispersed in a diluent such as barium sulphate or polytetrafluoroethylene (PTFE).

=== Studying fast reactions ===
Many commercially available CD spectrophotometers are designed to be outfitted with a stopped-flow device for studying the kinetics of fast reactions in solution. In the simplest form of the technique, the solutions of two reactants are rapidly mixed by being forced through a mixing chamber, on emerging from which the mixed fluid passes through an optical observation cell. At some point in time, the flow is suddenly stopped, and the reaction is monitored using a suitable spectroscopic probe, such as absorbance, fluorescence, fluorescence polarization, or circular dichroism. The change in spectroscopic signal as a function of time is recorded, and the rate constants that define the reaction kinetics can then be obtained by fitting the data using a suitable model.

== Experimental limitations ==
CD has also been studied in carbohydrates, but with limited success due to the experimental difficulties associated with measurement of CD spectra in the vacuum ultraviolet (VUV) region of the spectrum (100 to 200 nm), where the corresponding CD bands of unsubstituted carbohydrates lie. Substituted carbohydrates with bands above the VUV region have been successfully measured.

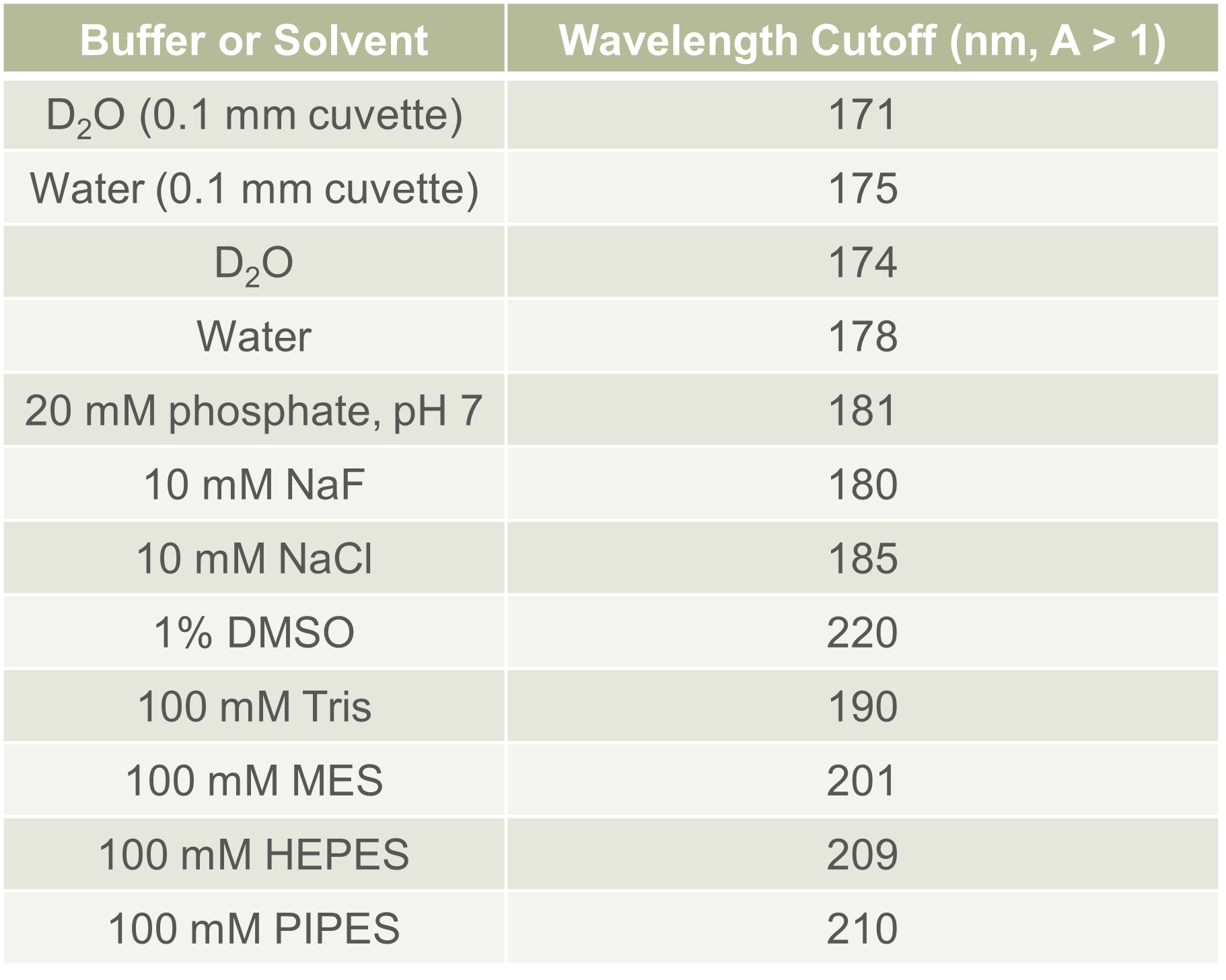
Buffers and salts exhibit surprisingly high absorbance at the lower end of the far-UV range, and their contribution to total sample absorbance must be taken into consideration.

Measurement of far-UV CD is also complicated by the fact that typical aqueous buffer systems at physiological buffer and salt concentrations often significantly absorb in the far-UV range. Phosphate, Tris, and HEPES are tolerated, but the concentration should be minimized (e.g., ideally 10-20 mM). Buffer salts also exhibit surprisingly high absorbance at the lower end of the far-UV range and it should be endeavored to stay below approximately 50 mM (pathlength dependent). Some experimenters have substituted fluoride for chloride ion because fluoride absorbs less in the far UV, and some have worked in pure water. Even water itself will absorb below approximately 180 nm. One notable workaround includes switching from H_{2}O to D_{2}O, thus potentially enabling measurements to as low as 171 nm. Because CD is fundamentally an absorption technique and obeys Beer's Law, another trick is to minimize buffer absorption by using shorter path length cells/cuvettes when working in the far-UV; 0.1-0.5 mm path lengths are not uncommon in this work. On the other hand, near-UV experiments do not suffer from most of these considerations and are typically conducted at higher concentrations in standard 10 mm pathlength cuvettes. Concentration and pathlength form a mathematical product to make absorbance and are therefore linearly interchangeable to achieve the same absorbance value.

In addition to measuring in aqueous systems, CD, particularly far-UV CD, can be measured in organic solvents e.g. ethanol, methanol, acetonitrile, trifluoroethanol (TFE) up to varying percentages of organic solvent. TFE has the advantage of being well-tolerated and inducing structure formation of proteins, inducing beta-sheets in some and alpha helices in others, which would not be observed under normal aqueous conditions. Many common organic solvents such as acetone, THF, dioxane, chloroform, and dichloromethane are generally incompatible with far-UV CD.

It may be of interest to note that the protein CD spectra used in secondary structure estimation are related to the π to π* and n to π* orbital transitions of the amide bonds in the amino acid backbone. These absorption bands lie partly in the so-called vacuum ultraviolet (wavelengths less than about 200 nm). The wavelength region of interest is actually inaccessible in air because of the strong absorption of light by oxygen at these wavelengths, which also results in the production of ozone. Ozone is a highly reactive gas that is damaging to health and to the optical components of the spectrometer. Moreover, even trace amounts of oxygen or ozone present in the lamp or monochromator will hinder acquisition of CD data. Ozone has a strong and broad absorbance peak at approximately 250 nm, and a further broad peak around 600 nm, thereby attenuating the light from the spectrometer lamp across a large portion of its wavelength range, particularly in the UV region. In practice these spectra are measured not in vacuum but in an oxygen-free instrument (purged with high-pure nitrogen gas from a tank or dewar).

Once oxygen has been eliminated, perhaps the second most important technical factor in working below 200 nm is to design the rest of the optical system to have low losses in this region. Critical in this regard is the use of aluminized mirrors whose coatings have been optimized for low loss in the far-UV region of the spectrum.

The usual light source in these instruments is a high pressure, xenon arc lamp. Xenon light sources are very stable and produce a broad and even emission spectrum from the far-UV through the near-IR. Ordinary xenon arc lamps are unsuitable for use in the low UV. Instead, specially constructed xenon arc lamps with envelopes made from high-purity synthetic fused silica must be used.

Light from synchrotron sources has a much higher flux at short wavelengths, and has been used to record CD down to 160 nm. In 2010 the CD spectrophotometer at the electron storage ring facility ISA at the University of Aarhus in Denmark was used to record solid state CD spectra down to 120 nm. At the quantum mechanical level, the feature density of circular dichroism and optical rotation are identical. Optical rotary dispersion and circular dichroism share the same quantum information content.

== See also ==
- Chirality-induced spin selectivity
- Hyper Rayleigh scattering optical activity
- Linear dichroism
- Magnetic circular dichroism
- Optical activity
- Optical isomerism
- Optical rotation
- Optical rotatory dispersion
- Protein Circular Dichroism Data Bank
- Synchrotron radiation circular dichroism spectroscopy
- Two-photon circular dichroism
- Vibrational circular dichroism
