= Protein Circular Dichroism Data Bank =

PCDDB

Content
- Description: circular dichroism spectral and metadata.

Contact
- Research center: Birkbeck College, University of London
- Laboratory: Department of Crystallography, Institute of Structural and Molecular Biology
- Authors: B A Wallace
- Primary citation: Whitmore & al. (2011)
- Release date: 2010

Access
- Website: pcddb.cryst.bbk.ac.uk

The Protein Circular Dichroism Data Bank (PCDDB) is a database of circular dichroism and synchrotron radiation.

== See also ==
- Circular dichroism
- Synchrotron Radiation Circular Dichroism
