= Optical rotatory dispersion =

Variation in the rotations of wavelengths of polarized light by a medium

In optics, optical rotatory dispersion is the variation of the specific rotation of a medium with respect to the wavelength of light. Usually described by German physicist Paul Drude's empirical relation:

$$[\alpha]_\lambda^T=\sum_{n=0}^\infty\frac{A_n}{\lambda^2-\lambda_n^2}$$

where $[\alpha]_\lambda^T$ is the specific rotation at temperature $T$ and wavelength $\lambda$, and $A_n$ and $\lambda_n$ are constants that depend on the properties of the medium.

Optical rotatory dispersion has applications in organic chemistry regarding determining the structure of organic compounds.

== Principles of operation ==
When white light passes through a polarizer, the extent of rotation of light depends on its wavelength. Short wavelengths are rotated more than longer wavelengths, per unit of distance. Because the wavelength of light determines its color, the variation of color with distance through the tube is observed. This dependence of specific rotation on wavelength is called optical rotatory dispersion. In all materials the rotation varies with wavelength. The variation is caused by two quite different phenomena. The first accounts in most cases for the majority of the variation in rotation and should not strictly be termed rotatory dispersion. It depends on the fact that optical activity is actually circular birefringence. In other words, a substance which is optically active transmits right circularly polarized light with a different velocity from left circularly polarized light.

In addition to this pseudodispersion which depends on the material thickness, there is a true rotatory dispersion which depends on the variation with wavelength of the indices of refraction for right and left circularly polarized light.

For wavelengths that are absorbed by the optically active sample, the two circularly polarized components will be absorbed to differing extents. This unequal absorption is known as circular dichroism. Circular dichroism causes incident linearly polarized light to become elliptically polarized. The two phenomena are closely related, just as are ordinary absorption and dispersion. If the entire optical rotatory dispersion spectrum is known, the circular dichroism spectrum can be calculated, and vice versa.

=== Chirality ===
In order for a molecule (or crystal) to exhibit circular birefringence and circular dichroism, it must be distinguishable from its mirror image. An object that cannot be superimposed on its mirror image is said to be chiral, and optical rotatory dispersion and circular dichroism are known as chiroptical properties.

Most biological molecules have one or more chiral centers and undergo enzyme-catalyzed transformations that either maintain or invert the chirality at one or more of these centers. Still other enzymes produce new chiral centers, always with a high specificity. These properties account for the fact that optical rotatory dispersion and circular dichroism are widely used in organic and inorganic chemistry and in biochemistry.

In the absence of magnetic fields, only chiral substances exhibit optical rotatory dispersion and circular dichroism. In a magnetic field, even substances that lack chirality rotate the plane of polarized light, as shown by Michael Faraday. Magnetic optical rotation is known as the Faraday effect, and its wavelength dependence is known as magnetic optical rotatory dispersion. In regions of absorption, magnetic circular dichroism is observable.

== See also ==
- Absorption
- Circular dichroism
- Enzyme
- Magnetic circular dichroism
- Polarimetry
- Polarography
- Hyper–Rayleigh scattering optical activity
- Raman optical activity (ROA)
- Stereochemistry
