= Linear dichroism =

Linear dichroism (LD) or diattenuation is the difference between absorption of light polarized parallel and polarized perpendicular to an orientation axis. It is the property of a material whose transmittance depends on the orientation of linearly polarized light incident upon it. As a technique, it is primarily used to study the functionality and structure of molecules. LD measurements are based on the interaction between matter and light and thus are a form of electromagnetic spectroscopy.

This effect has been applied across the EM spectrum, where different wavelengths of light can probe a host of chemical systems. The predominant use of LD currently is in the study of bio-macromolecules (e.g. DNA) as well as synthetic polymers.

== Basic information ==
=== Linear polarization ===
LD uses linearly polarized light, which is light that has been polarized in one direction only. This produces a wave, the electric field vector, which oscillates in only one plane, giving rise to a classic sinusoidal wave shape as the light travels through space. By using light parallel and perpendicular to the orientation direction it is possible to measure how much more energy is absorbed in one dimension of the molecule relative to the other, providing information to the experimentalist.

As light interacts with the molecule being investigated, should the molecule start absorbing the light then electron density inside the molecule will be shifted as the electron becomes photoexcited. This movement of charge is known as an electronic transition, the direction of which is called the electric transition polarisation. It is this property for which LD is a measurement.

The LD of an oriented molecule can be calculated using the following equation:-

LD = A_{║}- A_{┴}

Where A_{║} is the absorbance parallel to the orientation axis and A_{┴} is the absorbance perpendicular to the orientation axis.

Note that light of any wavelength can be used to generate an LD signal.

The LD signal generated therefore has two limits upon the signal that can be generated. For a chemical system whose electric transition is parallel to the orientation axis, the following equation can be written:

LD = A_{║}- A_{┴} = A_{║} > 0

For most chemical systems this represents an electric transition polarised across the length of the molecule (i.e. parallel to the orientation axis).

Alternatively, the electric transition polarisation can be found to be perfectly perpendicular to the orientation of the molecule, giving rise to the following equation:

LD = A_{║}- A_{┴} = - A_{┴} < 0

This equation represents the LD signal recorded if the electric transition is polarised across the width of the molecule (i.e. perpendicular to the orientation axis), which in the case of LD is the smaller of the two investigable axes.

LD can therefore be used in two ways. If the orientation of the molecules in flow is known, then the experimentalist can look at the direction of polarisation in the molecule (which gives an insight into the chemical structure of a molecule), or if the polarisation direction is unknown it can be used as a means of working out how oriented in flow a molecule is.

== UV linear dichroism ==
Ultraviolet (UV) LD is typically employed in the analysis of biological molecules, especially large, flexible, long molecules that prove difficult to structurally determine by such methods as NMR and X-ray diffraction.

=== DNA ===
DNA is almost ideally suited for UV LD detection. The molecule is very long and very thin, making it very easy to orient in flow. This gives rise to a strong LD signal. DNA systems that have been studied using UV LD include DNA-enzyme complexes and DNA-ligand complexes, the formation of the latter being easily observable through kinetic experiments.

=== Fibrous protein ===
Fibrous proteins, such as proteins involved in Alzheimer's disease and prion proteins fulfil the requirements for UV LD in that they are a class of long, thin molecules. In addition, cytoskeletal proteins can also be measured using LD.

=== Membrane proteins ===
The insertion of membrane proteins into a lipid membrane has been monitored using LD, supplying the experimentalist with information about the orientation of the protein relative to the lipid membrane at different time points.

In addition, other types of molecule have been analysed by UV LD, including carbon nanotubes and their associated ligand complexes.

== Alignment methods ==
=== Couette flow ===
The Couette flow orientation system is the most widely used method of sample orientation for UV LD. It has a number of characteristics which make it highly suitable as a method of sample alignment. Couette flow is currently the only established means of orientating molecules in the solution phase. This method also requires only very small amounts of analysis sample ( 20 - 40 μL) in order to generate an LD spectrum. The constant recirculation of sample is another useful property of the system, allowing many repeat measurements to be taken of each sample, decreasing the effect of noise on the final recorded spectrum.

Its mode of operation is very simple, with the sample sandwiched between a spinning tube and a stationary rod. As the sample is spun inside the cell, the light beam is shone through the sample, the parallel absorbance calculated from horizontally polarised light, the perpendicular absorbance from the vertically polarised light. Couette flow UV LD is currently the only commercially available means of LD orientation.

=== Stretched film ===
Stretched film linear dichroism is a method of orientation based on incorporating the sample molecules into a polyethylene film. The polyethylene film is then stretched, causing the randomly oriented molecules on the film to ‘follow’ the movement of the film. The stretching of the film results in the sample molecules being oriented in the direction of the stretch.

== Associated techniques ==
=== Circular Dichroism ===
LD is very similar to Circular Dichroism (CD), but with two important differences. (i) CD spectroscopy uses circularly polarized light whereas LD uses linearly polarized light. (ii) In CD experiments molecules are usually free in solution so they are randomly oriented. The observed spectrum is then a function only of the chiral or asymmetric nature of the molecules in the solution. With biomacromolecules CD is particularly useful for determining the secondary structure. By way of contrast, in LD experiments the molecules need to have a preferential orientation otherwise the LD=0. With biomacromolecules flow orientation is often used, other methods include stretched films, magnetic fields, and squeezed gels. Thus LD gives information such as alignment on a surface or the binding of a small molecule to a flow-oriented macromolecule, endowing it with different functionality from other spectroscopic techniques. The differences between LD and CD are complementary and can be a potent means for elucidating the structure of biological molecules when used in conjunction with one another, the combination of techniques revealing far more information than a single technique in isolation. For example, CD tells us when a membrane peptide or protein folds whereas LD tells when it inserts into a membrane.

=== Fluorescence detected Linear Dichroism ===
Fluorescence-detected linear dichroism (FDLD) is a very useful technique to the experimentalist as it combines the advantages of UV LD whilst also offering the confocal detection of the fluorescence emission. FDLD has applications in microscopy, where can be used as a means of two-dimensional surface mapping through differential polarisation spectroscopy (DPS) where the anisotropy of the scanned object allows an image to be recorded. FDLD can also be used in conjunction with intercalating fluorescent dyes (which can also be monitored using UV LD). The intensity difference recorded between the two types of polarised light for the fluorescence reading is proportional to the UV LD signal, allowing the use of DPS to image surfaces
