= Specific rotation =

Optical property of chiral chemical compounds

Recording optical rotation with a polarimeter: The plane of polarisation of plane polarised light (4) rotates (6) as it passes through an optically active sample (5). This angle is determined with a rotatable polarizing filter (7).

In chemistry, specific rotation ([α]) is a property of a chiral chemical compound. It is defined as the change in orientation of monochromatic plane-polarized light, per unit distance–concentration product, as the light passes through a sample of a compound in solution. Compounds which rotate the plane of polarization of a beam of plane polarized light clockwise are said to be dextrorotary, and correspond with positive specific rotation values, while compounds which rotate the plane of polarization of plane polarized light counterclockwise are said to be levorotary, and correspond with negative values. If a compound is able to rotate the plane of polarization of plane-polarized light, it is said to be “optically active”.

Specific rotation is an intensive property, distinguishing it from the more general phenomenon of optical rotation. As such, the observed rotation (α) of a sample of a compound can be used to quantify the enantiomeric excess of that compound, provided that the specific rotation ([α]) for the enantiopure compound is known. The variance of specific rotation with wavelength—a phenomenon known as optical rotatory dispersion—can be used to find the absolute configuration of a molecule. The concentration of bulk sugar solutions is sometimes determined by comparison of the observed optical rotation with the known specific rotation.

== Definition ==
The CRC Handbook of Chemistry and Physics defines specific rotation as:

For an optically active substance, defined by [α]^{θ}_{λ} = α/γl, where α is the angle through which plane polarized light is rotated by a solution of mass concentration γ and path length l. Here θ is the Celsius temperature and λ the wavelength of the light at which the measurement is carried out.

Values for specific rotation are reported in units of deg·mL·g^{−1}·dm^{−1}, which are typically shortened to just degrees, wherein the other components of the unit are tacitly assumed. These values should always be accompanied by information about the temperature, solvent and wavelength of light used, as all of these variables can affect the specific rotation. As noted above, temperature and wavelength are frequently reported as a superscript and subscript, respectively, while the solvent is reported parenthetically, or omitted if it happens to be water.

== Measurement ==
Examples
Compound name	[α]_{D}^{20} [deg dm^{−1} cm^{3} g^{−1}]
(S)-2-Bromobutane	+23.1
(R)-2-Bromobutane	−23.1
D-Fructose	−92
D-Glucose	+52.7
D-Sucrose	+66.37
D-Lactose	+52.3
Camphor	+44.26
Cholesterol	−31.5
Taxol A	−49
Penicillin V	+223
Progesterone	+172
Testosterone	+109
(+)-Cavicularin	+168.2

Optical rotation is measured with an instrument called a polarimeter. There is a linear relationship between the observed rotation and the concentration of optically active compound in the sample. There is a nonlinear relationship between the observed rotation and the wavelength of light used. Specific rotation is calculated using either of two equations, depending on whether the sample is a pure chemical to be tested or that chemical dissolved in solution.

=== For pure liquids ===
This equation is used:

$$[\alpha]_\lambda^T = \frac{\alpha}{l \times \rho}$$

In this equation, α (Greek letter "alpha") is the measured rotation in degrees, l is the path length in decimeters, and ρ (Greek letter "rho") is the density of the liquid in g/mL, for a sample at a temperature T (given in degrees Celsius) and wavelength λ (in nanometers). If the wavelength of the light used is 589 nanometers (the sodium D line), the symbol “D” is used. The sign of the rotation (+ or −) is always given.

$[\alpha]_D^{20} = +6.2$°

=== For solutions ===
For solutions, a slightly different equation is used:

$$[\alpha]_\lambda^T = \frac{ \alpha}{l \times c}$$

In this equation, α (Greek letter "alpha") is the measured rotation in degrees, l is the path length in decimeters, c is the concentration in g/mL, T is the temperature at which the measurement was taken (in degrees Celsius), and λ is the wavelength in nanometers.

For practical and historical reasons, concentrations are often reported in units of g/100mL. In this case, a correction factor in the numerator is necessary:

$$[\alpha]_\lambda^T = \frac{ 100 \times \alpha}{l \times c}$$

When using this equation, the concentration and the solvent may be provided in parentheses after the rotation. The rotation is reported using degrees, and no units of concentration are given (it is assumed to be g/100mL). The sign of the rotation (+ or −) is always given. If the wavelength of the light used is 589 nanometer (the sodium D line), the symbol “D” is used. If the temperature is omitted, it is assumed to be at standard room temperature (20 °C).

For example, the specific rotation of a compound would be reported in the scientific literature as:

$[\alpha]_D^{20}= +6.2$ (c 1.00, EtOH)

=== Dealing with large and small rotations ===
If a compound has a very large specific rotation or a sample is very concentrated, the actual rotation of the sample may be larger than 180°, and so a single polarimeter measurement cannot detect when this has happened (for example, the values +270° and −90° are not distinguishable, nor are the values 361° and 1°). In these cases, measuring the rotation at several different concentrations allows one to determine the true value. Another method would be to use shorter path-lengths to perform the measurements.

In cases of very small or very large angles, one can also use the variation of specific rotation with wavelength to facilitate measurement. Switching wavelength is particularly useful when the angle is small. Many polarimeters are equipped with a mercury lamp (in addition to the sodium lamp) for this purpose.

== Applications ==
=== Enantiomeric excess ===
If the specific rotation, ${[\alpha]_\lambda}$ of a pure chiral compound is known, it is possible to use the observed specific rotation, ${[\alpha]_\text{obs}}$ to determine the enantiomeric excess (ee), or "optical purity", of a sample of the compound, by using the formula:

$$ee(\%) = \frac{[\alpha]_\text{obs} \times 100}{[\alpha]_\lambda}$$

For example, if a sample of bromobutane measured under standard conditions has an observed specific rotation of −9.2°, this indicates that the net effect is due to (9.2°/23.1°)(100%) = 40% of the R enantiomer. The remainder of the sample is a racemic mixture of the enantiomers (30% R and 30% S), which has no net contribution to the observed rotation. The enantiomeric excess is 40%; the total concentration of R is 70%.

However, in practice the utility of this method is limited, as the presence of small amounts of highly rotating impurities can greatly affect the rotation of a given sample. Moreover, the optical rotation of a compound may be non-linearly dependent on its enantiomeric excess because of aggregation in solution. For these reasons other methods of determining the enantiomeric ratio, such as gas chromatography or HPLC with a chiral column, are generally preferred.

=== Absolute configuration ===
The variation of specific rotation with wavelength is called optical rotatory dispersion (ORD). ORD can be used in conjunction with computational methods to determine the absolute configuration of certain compounds.
