= List of scientific constants named after people =

This is a list of physical and mathematical constants named after people. Eponymous constants and their influence on scientific citations have been discussed in the literature. (Note: The article addresses the major premise in the argument against the Ortega hypothesis: that citation counts fairly reflect the importance of scientific contributions. It presents the results of a study of eponyms in scientific literature. The result is that usually when a journal paper refers to a unit, constant, technique, device, etc. that is named after a scientist (an "eponym"), that paper will not cite the person who is the namesake of the unit, constant, technique, etc. Early papers cite it more; later papers cite it less.)

- Apéry's constant – Roger Apéry
- Archimedes' constant (π, pi) – Archimedes
- Avogadro constant – Amedeo Avogadro
- Balmer's constant – Johann Jakob Balmer
- Belphegor's prime – Belphegor (demon)
- Bohr magneton – Niels Bohr
- Bohr radius – Niels Bohr
- Boltzmann constant – Ludwig Boltzmann
- Brun's constant – Viggo Brun
- Cabibbo angle – Nicola Cabibbo
- Chaitin's constant – Gregory Chaitin
- Champernowne constant – D. G. Champernowne
- Chandrasekhar limit – Subrahmanyan Chandrasekhar
- Copeland–Erdős constant – Paul Erdős and Peter Borwein
- Eddington number – Arthur Stanley Eddington
- Dunbar's number – Robin Dunbar
- Embree–Trefethen constant
- Erdős–Borwein constant
- Euler–Mascheroni constant ($\gamma$) – Leonhard Euler and Lorenzo Mascheroni
- Euler's number ($e$) – Leonhard Euler
- Faraday constant – Michael Faraday
- Feigenbaum constants – Mitchell Feigenbaum
- Fermi coupling constant – Enrico Fermi
- Gauss's constant – Carl Friedrich Gauss
- Graham's number – Ronald Graham
- Hartree energy – Douglas Hartree
- Hubble constant – Edwin Hubble
- Josephson constant – Brian David Josephson
- Kaprekar's constant – D. R. Kaprekar
- Kerr constant – John Kerr
- Khinchin's constant – Aleksandr Khinchin
- Landau–Ramanujan constant – Edmund Landau and Srinivasa Ramanujan
- Legendre's constant (one, 1) – Adrien-Marie Legendre
- Loschmidt constant – Johann Josef Loschmidt
- Ludolphsche Zahl – Ludolph van Ceulen
- Mean of Phidias (golden ratio, $\phi$, phi) – Phidias
- Meissel–Mertens constant
- Moser's number
- Newtonian constant of gravitation (gravitational constant, $G$) – Sir Isaac Newton
- Planck constant ($h$) – Max Planck

- Reduced Planck constant or Dirac constant ($h$-bar, ħ) – Max Planck, Paul Dirac

- Ramanujan–Soldner constant – Srinivasa Ramanujan and Johann Georg von Soldner
- Richardson constant – Owen Willans Richardson
- Rayo's number – Agustin Rayo
- Rydberg constant – Johannes Rydberg
- Sommerfeld constant – Arnold Sommerfeld
- Sagan's number – Carl Sagan
- Sackur–Tetrode constant – Otto Sackur and Hugo Tetrode
- Sierpiński's constant – Wacław Sierpiński
- Skewes' number – Stanley Skewes
- Stefan–Boltzmann constant – Jožef Stefan and Ludwig Boltzmann
- Theodorus' constant (√3 ≅ ±1.732050807568877...) – Theodorus of Cyrene
- Tupper's number – Jeff Tupper
- Viswanath's constant – Divakar Viswanath
- von Klitzing constant – Klaus von Klitzing
- Wien displacement law constant – Wilhelm Wien

== See also ==
- List of eponymous laws, for a list of laws named after people
- List of scientific laws named after people
- List of scientists whose names are used in physical constants
