= List of scientists whose names are used in physical constants =

Some of the constants used in science are named after scientists. Below is the list of the scientists whose names are used in physical constants.

== List of the scientists and the physical constants ==
Name of the scientist	Life	Nationality	Name of the constant
Isaac Newton	1643–1727	British	Newtonian constant of gravitation
Leonhard Euler	1707–1783	Swiss	Euler's number
Charles-Augustin de Coulomb	1736–1806	French	Coulomb constant
Amedeo Avogadro	1776–1856	Italian	Avogadro constant
Carl Friedrich Gauss	1777–1855	German	Gaussian gravitational constant
Michael Faraday	1791–1867	British	Faraday constant
Henri Victor Regnault	1810–1878	French	Regnault constant
Johann Josef Loschmidt	1821–1895	Austrian	Loschmidt constant
Émile Verdet	1824–1866	French	Verdet constant
Johann Jakob Balmer	1825–1898	Swiss	Balmer's constant
Ludvig Lorenz	1829–1891	Danish	Lorenz number
Josef Stefan	1835–1893	Slovene/Austrian	Stefan's constant (Note: Also called Stefan–Boltzmann constant)
Ludwig Boltzmann	1844–1906	Austrian	Boltzmann constant, Stefan–Boltzmann constant
Johannes Rydberg	1854–1919	Swedish	Rydberg constant
J. J. Thomson	1856–1940	British	Thomson cross section
Max Planck	1858–1947	German	Planck constant
Pierre Curie	1859–1906	French	Curie constant
Wilhelm Wien	1864–1928	German	Wien's constant
Arnold Sommerfeld	1868–1951	German	Sommerfeld constant
Owen Willans Richardson	1879–1959	British	Richardson constant
Otto Sackur	1880–1914	German	Sackur–Tetrode constant
Erwin Madelung	1881–1972	German	Madelung constant
Niels Bohr	1885–1962	Danish	Bohr magneton, Bohr radius
Edwin Hubble	1889–1953	American	Hubble constant (Note: A factor of proportionality, later on corrected several times. Also called Hubble Humason constant after (Milton L. Humason, 1881–1972))
Hugo Tetrode	1895–1931	Dutch	Sackur–Tetrode constant
Douglas Hartree	1897–1958	British	Hartree energy
Enrico Fermi	1901–1954	Italian/American	Fermi coupling constant
Roger Apéry	1916–1994	Greek/French	Apéry's constant
Günter Sauerbrey	1933-2003	German	Sauerbrey constant
Steven Weinberg	1933-2021	American	Weinberg angle
Brian Josephson	1940–	British	Josephson constant
Klaus von Klitzing	1943–	German	von Klitzing constant

== See also ==
- List of scientists whose names are used as units
- List of chemical elements named after people
- Unit of measurement
