= Yttrium iron garnet =

Synthetic garnet

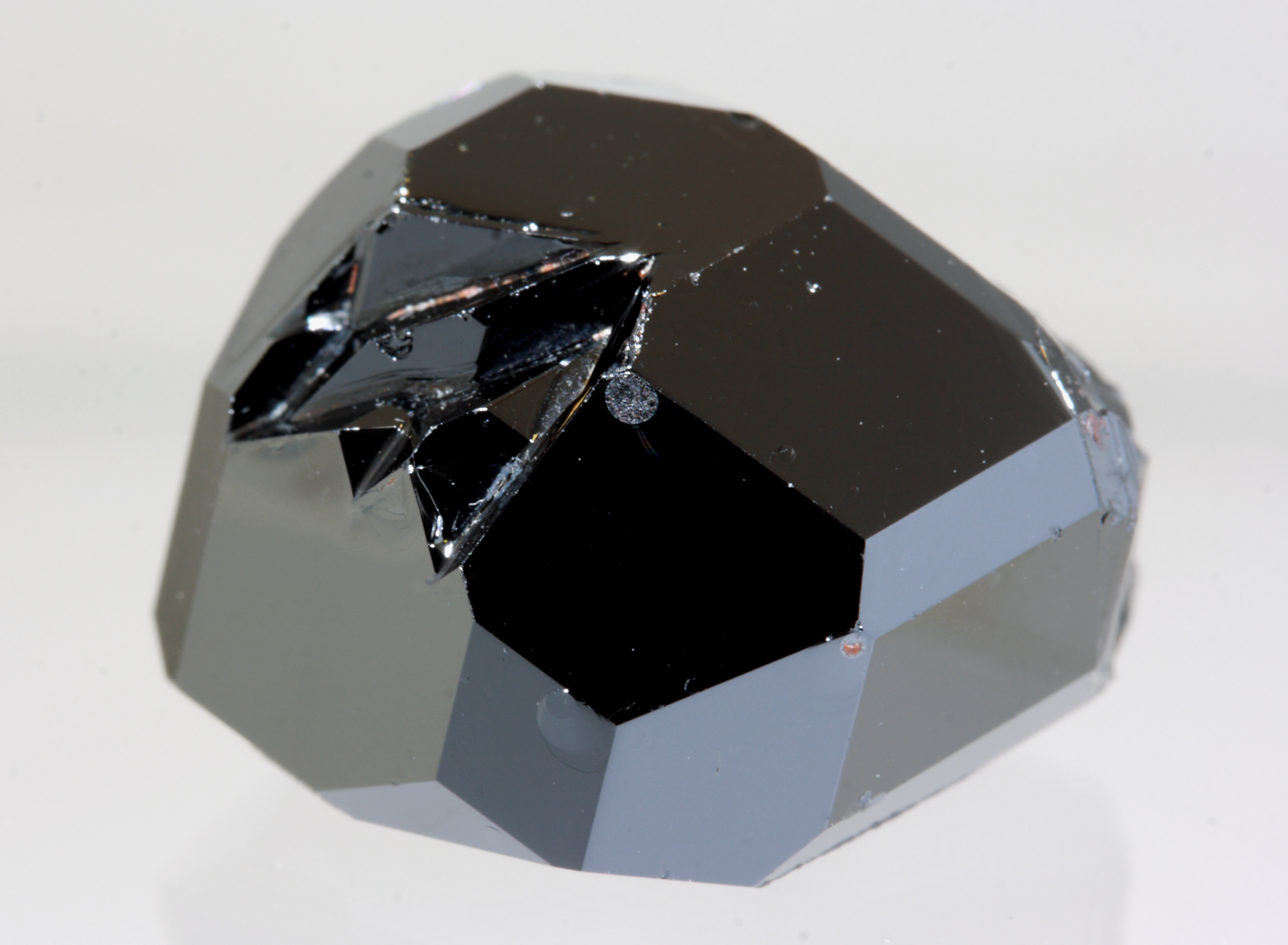

General
- Category: Synthetic mineral
- Formula: Y_{3}Fe_{2}(FeO_{4})_{3} or Y_{3}Fe_{5}O_{12}

Identification
- Formula mass: 737.94
- Color: Green
- Density: 5.11 g/cm3
- Other characteristics: Ferrimagnetic material

Yttrium iron garnet (YIG) is a kind of synthetic garnet, with chemical composition Y_{3}Fe_{2}(FeO_{4})_{3}, or Y_{3}Fe_{5}O_{12}. It is a ferrimagnetic material with a Curie temperature of 560 K (287 °C). YIG may also be known as yttrium ferrite garnet, or as iron yttrium oxide or yttrium iron oxide, the latter two names usually associated with powdered forms.

== Production ==
Several methods are utilized for synthesis of yttrium iron garnet each with their pros and cons. The solid-state reaction method is a traditional approach for YIG synthesis, involving the high-temperature firing of a mixture of yttrium and iron oxides. This cost-effective technique can produce pure YIG crystals but requires careful control of temperature and atmosphere to prevent impurities.

Liquid phase epitaxy (LPE) is another key method, especially for creating thin YIG films with excellent uniformity. Ideal for optical and microwave devices, LPE enables precise film growth on substrates. However, its high equipment costs and complex procedures limit its use to applications where superior quality is essential.

== Properties ==
In YIG, the five iron(III) ions occupy two octahedral and three tetrahedral sites, with the yttrium(III) ions coordinated by eight oxygen ions in an irregular cube. The iron ions in the two coordination sites exhibit different spins, resulting in magnetic behavior. By substituting specific sites with rare-earth elements, for example, interesting magnetic properties can be obtained.

YIG has a high Verdet constant which results in the Faraday effect, high Q factor in microwave frequencies, low absorption of infrared wavelengths down to 1200 nm, and very small linewidth in electron spin resonance. These properties make it useful for MOI (magneto optical imaging) applications in superconductors.

== Applications ==
YIG is used in microwave, acoustic, optical, and magneto-optical applications, e.g. microwave YIG filters, or acoustic transmitters and transducers. It is transparent for light wavelengths over 600 nm — the infrared end of the spectrum. It also finds use in solid-state lasers in Faraday rotators, in data storage, and in various nonlinear optics applications.

== See also ==
- Gadolinium gallium garnet
- Terbium gallium garnet
- Yttrium aluminium garnet
- YIG sphere
