= Terbium gallium garnet =

Synthetic garnet

General
- Category: Synthetic mineral
- Formula: Tb_{3}Ga_{5}O_{12}

Identification
- Optical properties: Faraday rotator material
- Refractive index: 1.95
- Other characteristics: Paramagnetic material

Terbium gallium garnet (TGG) is a kind of synthetic garnet, with the chemical composition Tb_{3}Ga_{5}O_{12}. This is a Faraday rotator material with excellent transparency properties and is very resistant to laser damage. TGG can be used in optical isolators for laser systems, in optical circulators for fiber optic systems, in optical modulators, and in current and magnetic field sensors.

TGG has a high Verdet constant which results in the Faraday effect. The Verdet constant increases substantially as the mineral approaches cryogenic temperatures. The highest Verdet constants are found in terbium doped dense flint glasses or in crystals of TGG. The Faraday effect is chromatic (i.e. it depends on wavelength) and therefore the Verdet constant is quite a strong function of wavelength. At 632 nm, the Verdet constant for TGG is reported to be −131 rad/(T·m), whereas at 1064 nm it falls to −38 rad/(T·m). This behavior means that the devices manufactured with a certain degree of rotation at one wavelength, will produce much less rotation at longer wavelengths. Many Faraday rotators and isolators are adjustable by varying the degree to which the amount of the Faraday rotator material is inserted into the magnetic field of the device. In this way, the device can be tuned for use with a range of lasers within the design range of the device.

== See also ==
- Gadolinium gallium garnet
- Yttrium iron garnet
- Yttrium aluminium garnet
