= Faraday effect =

Physical magneto-optical phenomenon

The Faraday effect or Faraday rotation, sometimes referred to as the magneto-optic Faraday effect (MOFE), is a physical magneto-optical phenomenon. The Faraday effect causes a polarization rotation which is proportional to the projection of the magnetic field along the direction of the light propagation. Formally, it is a special case of gyroelectromagnetism obtained when the dielectric permittivity tensor is diagonal. This effect occurs in most optically transparent dielectric materials (including liquids) under the influence of magnetic fields.

Discovered by Michael Faraday in 1845, the Faraday effect was the first experimental evidence that light and electromagnetism are related. The theoretical basis of electromagnetic radiation (which includes visible light) was completed by James Clerk Maxwell in the 1860s.

The Faraday effect is caused by left and right circularly polarized waves propagating at slightly different speeds, a property known as optical rotation (or circular birefringence). Since a linear polarization can be decomposed into the superposition of two equal-amplitude circularly polarized components of opposite handedness and different phase, the effect of a relative phase shift, induced by the Faraday effect, is to rotate the orientation of a wave's linear polarization.

The Faraday effect has applications in measuring instruments. For instance, the Faraday effect has been used to measure optical rotatory power, for remote sensing of magnetic fields (such as fiber optic current sensors) and for magneto-optical imaging. The Faraday effect is used in spintronics research to study the polarization of electron spins in semiconductors. In the superconducting field, it is used to study the dynamic of fluxons in thin films. Faraday rotators can be used for amplitude modulation of light, and are the basis of optical isolators and optical circulators; such components are required in optical telecommunications and other laser applications.

== History ==
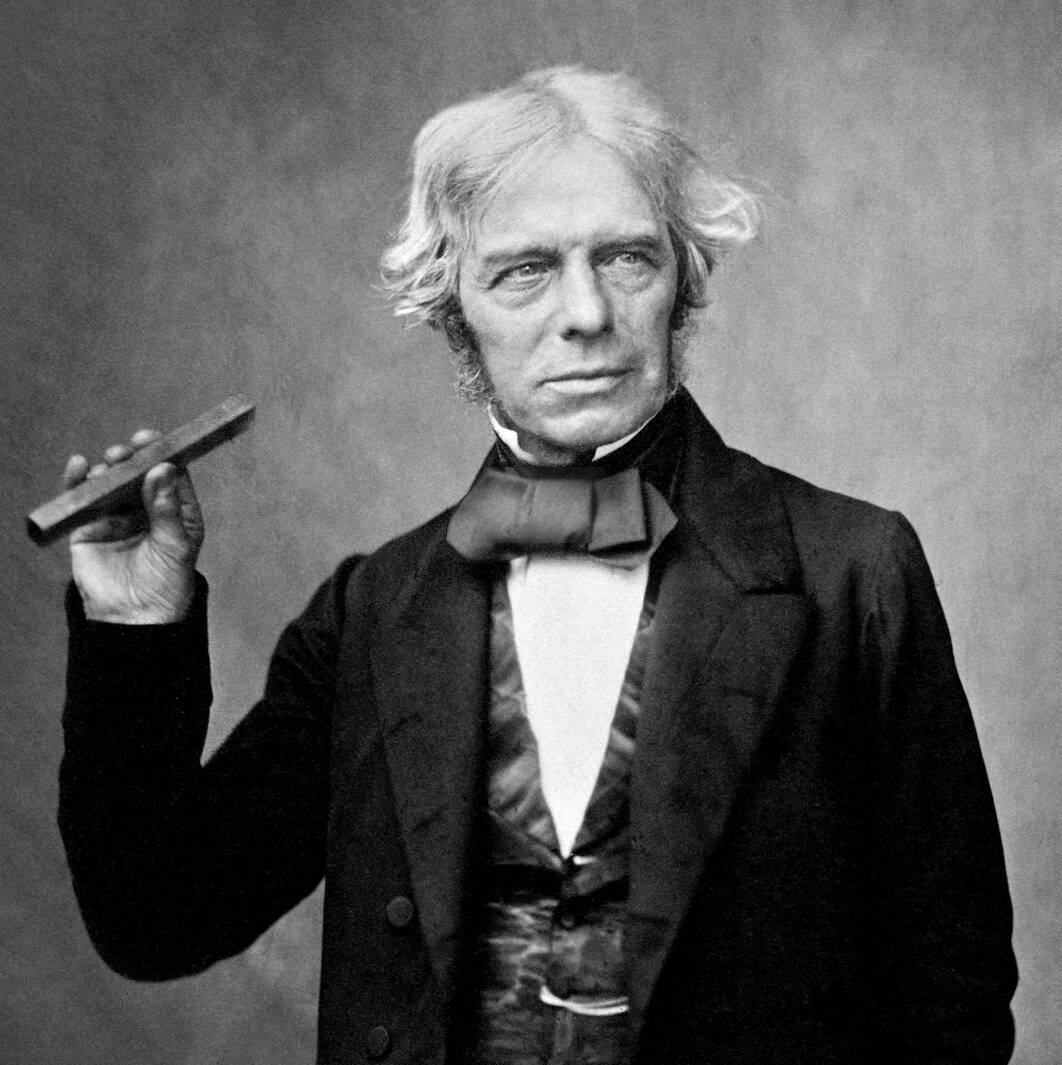
Michael Faraday holding a piece of glass of the type he used to demonstrate the effect of magnetism on polarization of light, c. 1857.

By 1845, it was known through the work of Augustin-Jean Fresnel, Étienne-Louis Malus, and others, that different materials are able to modify the direction of polarization of light when appropriately oriented, making polarized light a very powerful tool to investigate the properties of transparent materials. Faraday firmly believed that light was an electromagnetic phenomenon, and as such should be affected by electromagnetic forces. He spent considerable effort looking for evidence of electric forces affecting the polarization of light through what are now known as electro-optic effects, starting with decomposing electrolytes.

=== Faraday experiments ===
Faraday then attempted to look for the effects of magnetic forces on light passing through various substances. After several unsuccessful trials, he happened to test a piece of "heavy" glass, containing equal proportions of silica, boracic acid (B(OH)_{3}) and lead oxide, that he had made during his earlier work on glass manufacturing. Faraday observed that when a beam of polarized light passed through the glass in the direction of an applied magnetic field, the polarization of light rotated by an angle that was proportional to the strength of the force. He used a Nicol prism to measure the polarization. He was later able to reproduce the effect in several other solids, liquids, and gases by procuring stronger electromagnets.

The discovery is well documented in Faraday's daily notebook. On 13 Sept. 1845, in paragraph #7504, under the rubric Heavy Glass, he wrote:

... BUT, when the contrary magnetic poles were on the same side, there was an effect produced on the polarized ray, and thus magnetic force and light were proved to have relation to each other. ...

— Faraday, Paragraph #7504, Daily notebook

He summarized the results of his experiments on 30 Sept. 1845, in paragraph #7718, famously writing:

... Still, I have at last succeeded in illuminating a magnetic curve or line of force, and in magnetizing a ray of light. ...

— Faraday, Paragraph #7718, Daily notebook

This is the principle used in construction of Faraday rotators.

=== Other experiments ===
A year after Faraday, Edmond Becquerel discovered that the rotation depends on the wavelength. George Biddell Airy developed a theoretical model about the same time.

From 1854 to 1863, Émile Verdet carried out an extensive investigation of the effect. Verdet verified quantitatively the proportionality relation between rotation and magnetic field. The proportionality constant is now called the Verdet constant. Verdet suggested that the origin of the effect was the difference in velocity between right and left-handed polarized light, based on Airy's theory. He also discovered negative Faraday rotation in iron salts.

In 1876, the magneto-optic Kerr effect was discovered by John Kerr, changes in light polarization when reflected from a magnetic surface.

In 1878, August Kundt and Wilhelm Röntgen demonstrated the Faraday effect in a gas at high pressures. The same year, Augusto Righi devised an experiment to test the hypothesis that the right- and left-handed components traveled at different speeds.

In 1897, Henri Becquerel (son of Edmond) wrote the formula for the angle of rotation of the Faraday effect. He also demonstrated the Faraday effect in gases at ambient pressure and also tested the speed dependence on polarization. In 1906, his son Jean Becquerel, discovered a specific type of Faraday effect in paramagnetic materials. The dispersion curve was symmetric in paramagnetic materials and asymmetric in diamagnetic ones.

=== Microscopic theory ===
Using the Heisenberg model of ferromagnetism in 1932, Otto Halpern and Henry Rainsford Hulme related different selection rules of right and left-handed polarized light in the presence of spin–orbit interaction to the Faraday effect

A more detailed theory of magneto-optic effects was developed in 1955 later by Petros N. Argyres who included spin-orbit coupling and spin interactions.

== Physical interpretation ==
The linear polarized light that is seen to rotate in the Faraday effect can be seen as consisting of the superposition of a right- and a left- circularly polarized beam (this superposition principle is fundamental in many branches of physics). We can look at the effects of each component (right- or left-polarized) separately, and see what effect this has on the result.

In circularly polarized light the direction of the electric field rotates at the frequency of the light, either clockwise or counter-clockwise. In a material, this electric field causes a force on the charged particles that compose the material (because of their large charge to mass ratio, the electrons are most heavily affected). The motion thus effected will be circular, and circularly moving charges will create their own (magnetic) field in addition to the external magnetic field. There will thus be two different cases: the created field will be parallel to the external field for one (circular) polarization, and in the opposing direction for the other polarization direction – thus the net B field is enhanced in one direction and diminished in the opposite direction. This changes the dynamics of the interaction for each beam and one of the beams will be slowed more than the other, causing a phase difference between the left- and right-polarized beam. When the two beams are added after this phase shift, the result is again a linearly polarized beam, but with a rotation of the polarization vector.

The direction of polarization rotation depends on the properties of the material through which the light is shone. A full treatment would have to take into account the effect of the external and radiation-induced fields on the wave function of the electrons, and then calculate the effect of this change on the refractive index of the material for each polarization, to see whether the right- or left-circular polarization is slowed more.

== Mathematical formulation ==
Formally, the magnetic permeability is treated as a non-diagonal tensor as expressed by the equation:

$$\mathbf{B}(\omega) = \begin{bmatrix}
\mu_{1} & -i \mu_{2} &       0 \\
i \mu_{2} &    \mu_{1} &       0 \\
0 &          0 & \mu_{z} \\
\end{bmatrix} \mathbf{H}(\omega)$$

The relation between the angle of rotation of the polarization and the magnetic field in a transparent material is:

Polarization rotation due to the Faraday effect

$$\beta = \mathcal{V}Bd$$

where

β is the angle of rotation (in radians)
B is the magnetic flux density in the direction of propagation (in teslas)
d is the length of the path (in meters) where the light and magnetic field interact
$\scriptstyle \mathcal{V}$ is the Verdet constant for the material. This empirical proportionality constant (in units of radians per tesla per meter) varies with wavelength and temperature and is tabulated for various materials.

A positive Verdet constant corresponds to L-rotation (anticlockwise) when the direction of propagation is parallel to the magnetic field and to R-rotation (clockwise) when the direction of propagation is anti-parallel. Thus, if a ray of light is passed through a material and reflected back through it, the rotation doubles.

Some materials, such as terbium gallium garnet (TGG) have extremely high Verdet constants (≈ −134 rad/(T·m) for 632 nm light). By placing a rod of this material in a strong magnetic field, Faraday rotation angles of over 0.78 rad (45°) can be achieved. This allows the construction of Faraday rotators, which are the principal component of Faraday isolators, devices which transmit light in only one direction. The Faraday effect can, however, be observed and measured in a Terbium-doped glass with Verdet constant as low as (≈ −20 rad/(T·m) for 632 nm light). Similar isolators are constructed for microwave systems by using ferrite rods in a waveguide with a surrounding magnetic field. A thorough mathematical description can be found here.

== Examples ==
=== In plasma ===
In plasma, the effect is caused by free electrons and can be characterized as a difference in the refractive index seen by the two circularly polarized propagation modes. Hence, in contrast to the Faraday effect in solids or liquids, the Faraday rotation angle (β) has a simple dependence on the wavelength of light (λ), namely:

$$\beta = R_M \, \lambda^2$$,

where the overall strength of the effect is characterized by $R_M$, the rotation measure. This in turn depends on the projection of the magnetic field along the line of sight $B_\parallel$ and the number density of electrons n_{e}, both of which vary along the propagation path. In the ideal-plasma approximation, the rotation measure is given (in the Gaussian CGS units) by

$$R_M = \frac{e^3}{2\pi m^2c^4}\int_0^d n_e(s) B_\parallel(s) \;\mathrm{d}s$$

or, in the SI units, by

$$R_M = \frac{e^3}{8\pi^2 \varepsilon_0 m^2 c^3} \int_0^d n_e(s) B_{||}(s) \;\mathrm{d}s \approx
(2.62 \times 10^{-13}\, \mathrm T^{-1})\times\, \int_0^d n_e(s) B_\parallel(s)\; \mathrm{d}s$$

where

n_{e}(s) is the density of free electrons at each point s along the path;
B_{‖}(s) is the component of the magnetic field in the direction of propagation at each point s along the path;
e is the elementary charge;
c is the speed of light in vacuum;
m is the electron mass;
$\scriptstyle\epsilon_0$ is the vacuum permittivity,

and the integral is taken over the entire path from the source to the observer.

Electron Coulomb collisions and plasma instabilities may significantly alter this simple expression, however.

==== Interstellar medium ====
Faraday rotation is an important tool in astronomy for the measurement of magnetic fields, which can be estimated from rotation measures given a knowledge of the electron number density in the interstellar medium. In the case of radio pulsars, the dispersion caused by these electrons results in a time delay between pulses received at different wavelengths, which can be measured in terms of the electron column density, or dispersion measure. A measurement of both the dispersion measure and the rotation measure therefore yields the weighted mean of the magnetic field along the line of sight. The same information can be obtained from objects other than pulsars, if the dispersion measure can be estimated based on reasonable guesses about the propagation path length and typical electron densities. In particular, Faraday rotation measurements of polarized radio signals from extragalactic radio sources occulted by the solar corona can be used to estimate both the electron density distribution and the direction and strength of the magnetic field in the coronal plasma.

==== Ionosphere ====
Radio waves passing through the Earth's ionosphere are likewise subject to the Faraday effect. The ionosphere consists of a plasma containing free electrons which contribute to Faraday rotation according to the above equation, whereas the positive ions are relatively massive and have little influence. In conjunction with the Earth's magnetic field, rotation of the polarization of radio waves thus occurs. Since the density of electrons in the ionosphere varies greatly on a daily basis, as well as over the sunspot cycle, the magnitude of the effect varies. However the effect is always proportional to the square of the wavelength, so even at the UHF television frequency of 500 MHz (λ = 60 cm), there can be more than a complete rotation of the axis of polarization. A consequence is that although most radio transmitting antennas are either vertically or horizontally polarized, the polarization of a medium or short wave signal after reflection by the ionosphere is rather unpredictable. However the Faraday effect due to free electrons diminishes rapidly at higher frequencies (shorter wavelengths) so that at microwave frequencies, used by satellite communications, the transmitted polarization is maintained between the satellite and the ground.

=== Semiconductors ===
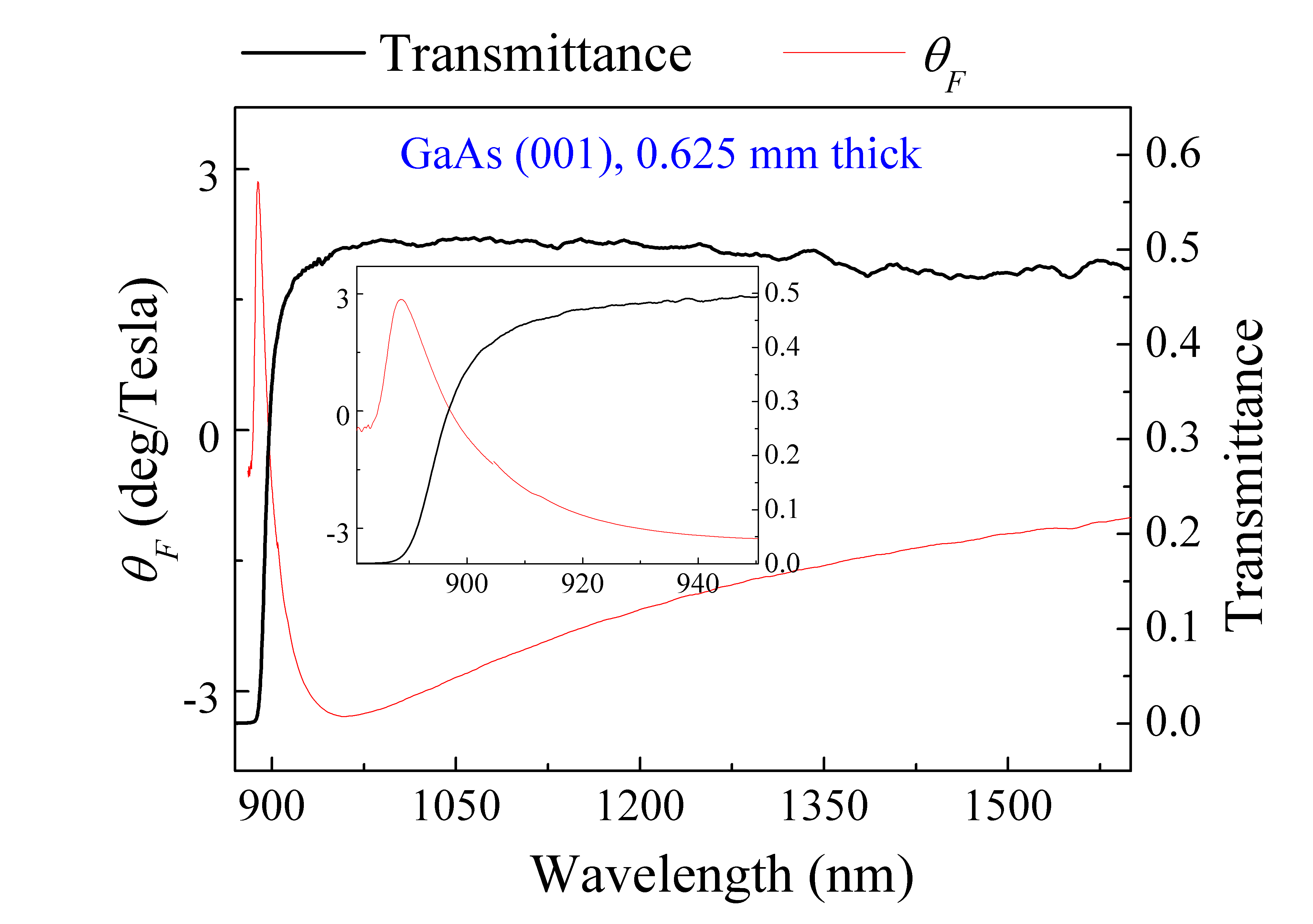
GaAs-Faraday rotation spectrum

Due to spin-orbit coupling, undoped GaAs single crystal exhibits much larger Faraday rotation than glass (SiO_{2}). Considering the atomic arrangement is different along the (100) and (110) plane, one might think the Faraday rotation is polarization dependent. However, experimental work revealed an immeasurable anisotropy in the wavelength range from 880–1,600 nm. Based on the large Faraday rotation, one might be able to use GaAs to calibrate the B field of the terahertz electromagnetic wave which requires very fast response time. Around the band gap, the Faraday effect shows resonance behavior.

More generally, (ferromagnetic) semiconductors return both electro-gyration and a Faraday response in the high frequency domain. The combination of the two is described by gyroelectromagnetic media, for which gyroelectricity and gyromagnetism (Faraday effect) may occur at the same time.

=== Organic materials ===
In organic materials, Faraday rotation is typically small, with a Verdet constant in the visible wavelength region on the order of a few hundred degrees per Tesla per meter, decreasing proportional to $\lambda^{-2}$ in this region. While the Verdet constant of organic materials does increase around electronic transitions in the molecule, the associated light absorption makes most organic materials bad candidates for applications. There are however also isolated reports of large Faraday rotation in organic liquid crystals without associated absorption.

=== Plasmonic and magnetic materials ===
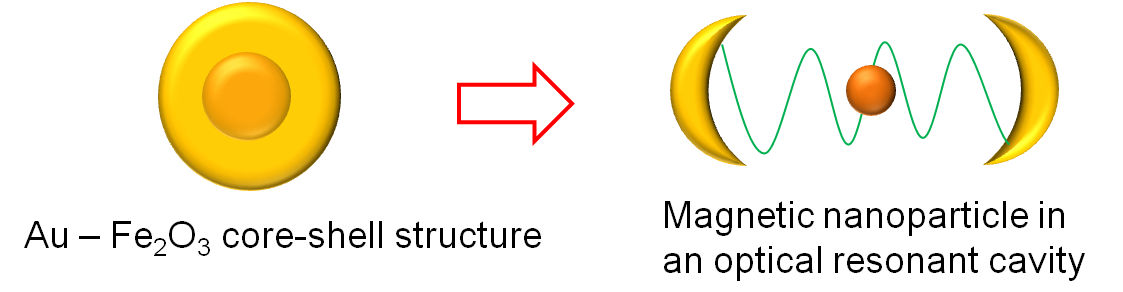

In 2009 γ-Fe_{2}O_{3}-Au core-shell nanostructures were synthesized to integrate magnetic (γ-Fe_{2}O_{3}) and plasmonic (Au) properties into one composite. Faraday rotation with and without the plasmonic materials was tested and rotation enhancement under 530 nm light irradiation was observed. Researchers claim that the magnitude of the magneto-optical enhancement is governed primarily by the spectral overlap of the magneto-optical transition and the plasmon resonance.

The reported composite magnetic/plasmonic nanostructure can be visualized to be a magnetic particle embedded in a resonant optical cavity. Because of the large density of photon states in the cavity, the interaction between the electromagnetic field of the light and the electronic transitions of the magnetic material is enhanced, resulting in a larger difference between the velocities of the right- and left-hand circularized polarization, therefore enhancing Faraday rotation.

== See also ==
- Electro-optic Kerr effect
- Faraday rotator
- Inverse Faraday effect
- Magnetic circular dichroism
- Magneto-optic Kerr effect
- Optical rotation
- Polarization spectroscopy
- QMR effect (quadratic rather than linear)
- Voigt effect (magnetic-linear birefringence)
