= Fiber-optic current sensor =

Sensor for measuring direct current by magneto-optic effect

A fiber-optic current sensor (FOCS) is a device designed to measure direct current. Utilizing a single-ended optical fiber wrapped around the current conductor, FOCS exploits the magneto-optic effect (Faraday effect). The FOCS can measure uni- or bi-directional DC currents up to 600 kA, with an accuracy within ±0.1% of the measured value.

== Design ==
Interferometric fiber optic current sensors (FOCS) employ circularly polarized light traversing a closed loop path around an electrical conductor's current-generated magnetic flux, which reflects off a mirror. The light experiences a reciprocal phase shift as the refractive index, and effective path length, is modulated by the presence of a magnetic field, which optically induces circular birefringence. The interference pattern relative to a reference waveform is an optical intensity value corresponding to the current magnitude.

Such sensors are often employed in applications where galvanic isolation is required, as the glass fiber is an excellent electrical insulator.

FOCS sensors are vulnerable to acoustic perturbations in the fiber optical cables, as changes to the linear birefringence of the fiber cable causes additional phase shifts between the orthogonally polarized modes which must be of equal magnitude to generate circular polarization, as an exact quarter wave displacement between the fast and slow axis modes is required for a circular polarization state, and additional phase shifts in the sensing network cause the circularly polarized measurement photons, which experience a phase shift in the fiber optic current sensing coil in proportion to magnetic field density, to degenerate to a random form of elliptical polarization, which degrades interference measurement abilities as the measurement and reference photon wave forms become non-coherent at the analyzer.

== Applications ==
As FOCS are resistant to effects from magnetic or electrical field interferences, they are ideal for the measurement of electrical currents and high voltages in electrical power stations or other environments with large currents.

FOCS sensors are also frequently used in military applications, as the sensors are readily hardened against electromagnetic pulses due to their inherently non-conductive nature.
