= Optical add-drop multiplexer =

Device used to route channels in optical communication systems

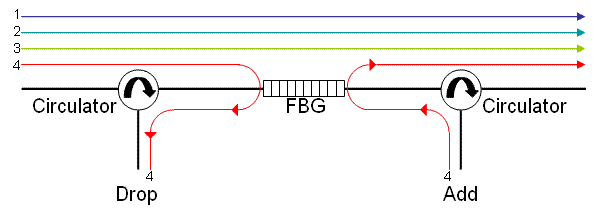
Optical add-drop multiplexer, using a fiber Bragg grating and two circulators.

An optical add-drop multiplexer (OADM) is a device used in wavelength-division multiplexing (WDM) systems for multiplexing and routing different channels of light into or out of a single-mode fiber (SMF). This is a type of optical node, which is generally used for the formation and the construction of optical telecommunications networks. "Add" and "drop" here refer to the capability of the device to add one or more new wavelength channels to an existing multi-wavelength WDM signal, and/or to drop (remove) one or more channels, passing those signals to another network path. An OADM may be considered to be a specific type of optical cross-connect.

A traditional OADM consists of three stages: an optical demultiplexer, an optical multiplexer, and between them a method of reconfiguring the paths between the demultiplexer, the multiplexer and a set of ports for adding and dropping signals. The demultiplexer separates wavelengths in an input fiber onto ports. The reconfiguration can be achieved by a fiber patch panel or by optical switches which direct the wavelengths to the multiplexer or to drop ports. The multiplexer multiplexes the wavelength channels that are to continue on from demultiplexer ports with those from the add ports, onto a single output fiber.

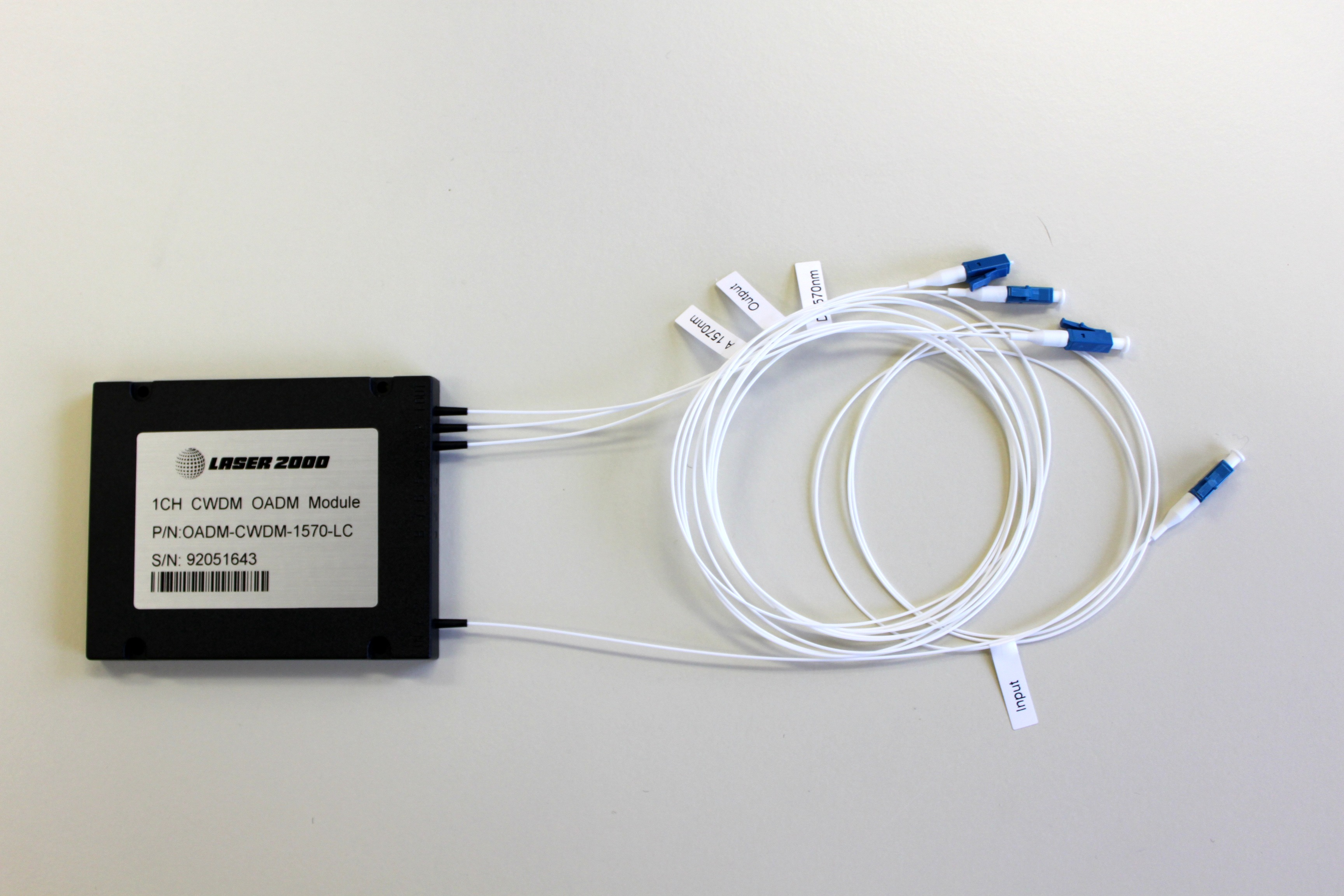
OADM module for CWDM transmission

All the lightpaths that directly pass an OADM are termed cut-through lightpaths, while those that are added or dropped at the OADM node are termed added/dropped lightpaths. An OADM with remotely reconfigurable optical switches (for example 1×2) in the middle stage is called a reconfigurable OADM (ROADM). Ones without this feature are known as fixed OADMs. While the term OADM applies to both types, it is often used interchangeably with ROADM.

Physically, there are several ways to make an OADM. There are a variety of demultiplexer and multiplexer technologies including thin film filters, fiber Bragg gratings with optical circulators, free space grating devices and integrated planar arrayed waveguide gratings. The switching or reconfiguration functions range from the manual fiber patch panel to a variety of switching technologies including microelectromechanical systems (MEMS), liquid crystal and thermo-optic switches in planar waveguide circuits.

Although both have add/drop functionality, OADMs are distinct from add-drop multiplexers. The former function in the photonic domain under wavelength-division multiplexing, while the latter are implicitly considered to function in the traditional SONET/SDH networks.

== See also ==
- Multicast lightpaths
- Optical mesh network
- Reconfigurable optical add-drop multiplexer
