= QMR =

QMR may refer to:

- A Krylov subspace algorithm
- The QMR effect
- Queen's Medical Review, a student-run publication for Queen's School of Medicine students
