= Lightpath =

Lightpath or Lightpaths may refer to:

- Nelson Street Cycleway, Auckland, New Zealand, in particular that part located on an old motorway off-ramp and named 'Te Ara I Whiti' (Māori for 'Lightpath')
- Optical path, the path taken by light in traversing a system
- Lightpath (optical network), a section of an optical network that light travels through without being modified
- An internet and telephone service provided by Optimum Communications
- Lightpaths, a 1997 novel by Howard V. Hendrix
