= Gadolinium gallium garnet =

Synthetic crystalline material of the garnet group

General
- Category: synthetic mineral
- Formula: Gd_{3}Ga_{5}O_{12}
- Crystal system: cubic

Identification
- Color: transparent, colorless to light brown or yellow. May also be orange or blue.
- Mohs scale hardness: 6.5 (other sources 7.5)
- Luster: vitreous to subadamantine
- Specific gravity: 7.05 (+.04, -.10)
- Density: 7.08 g/cm^{3}
- Polish luster: vitreous to subadamantine
- Optical properties: Single refractive
- Refractive index: 1.970 (+.060)
- Birefringence: none
- Pleochroism: none
- Dispersion: .045
- Ultraviolet fluorescence: moderate to strong pinkish orange in shortwave

Gadolinium gallium garnet (GGG, Gd_{3}Ga_{5}O_{12}) is a synthetic crystalline material of the garnet group, with good mechanical, thermal, and optical properties. It is typically colorless. It has a cubic lattice, a density of 7.08 g/cm^{3} and its Mohs hardness is variously noted as 6.5 and 7.5. Its crystals are produced with the Czochralski method. During production, various dopants can be added for colour modification. The material is also used in fabrication of various optical components and as a substrate material for magneto–optical films (magnetic bubble memory). It also finds use in jewelry as a diamond simulant. GGG can also be used as a seed substrate for the growth of other garnets such as yttrium iron garnet.

Another interesting aspect to this synthetic gemstone is that it exhibits both fluorescence under UV, and phosphorescence (glow-in-the-dark) properties.

It is produced by the Czochralski method using Gallium(III) oxide and Gadolinium(III) oxide. This is usually done at 2000 degrees C in an iridium crucible. The cost of a GGG wafer comes from refining the starting oxides to a purity of at least 99.9%.

== See also ==
- Micro-pulling-down
- Terbium gallium garnet
- Yttrium aluminium garnet
- GAGG:Ce (cerium-doped gadolinium aluminium gallium garnet)
