= Polarization spectroscopy =

Polarization spectroscopy comprises a set of spectroscopic techniques based on polarization properties of light (not necessarily visible one; UV, X-ray, infrared, or in any other frequency range of the electromagnetic radiation). By analyzing the polarization properties of light, decisions can be made about the media that emitted the light (or the media the light passes/scatters through). Alternatively, a source of polarized light may be used to probe a media; in this case, the changes in the light polarization (compared to the incidental light) allow inferences about the media's properties.

In general, any kind of anisotropy in the media results in some sort of change in polarization. Such an anisotropy can be either inherent to the media (e.g., in the case of a crystal substance), or imposed externally (e.g., in the presence of magnetic field in plasma or by another laser beam).

== See also ==
- Faraday effect
- Plasma diagnostics
- Stark effect
- Zeeman effect
