= Optical isolator =

Optical component allowing the transmission of light in only one direction

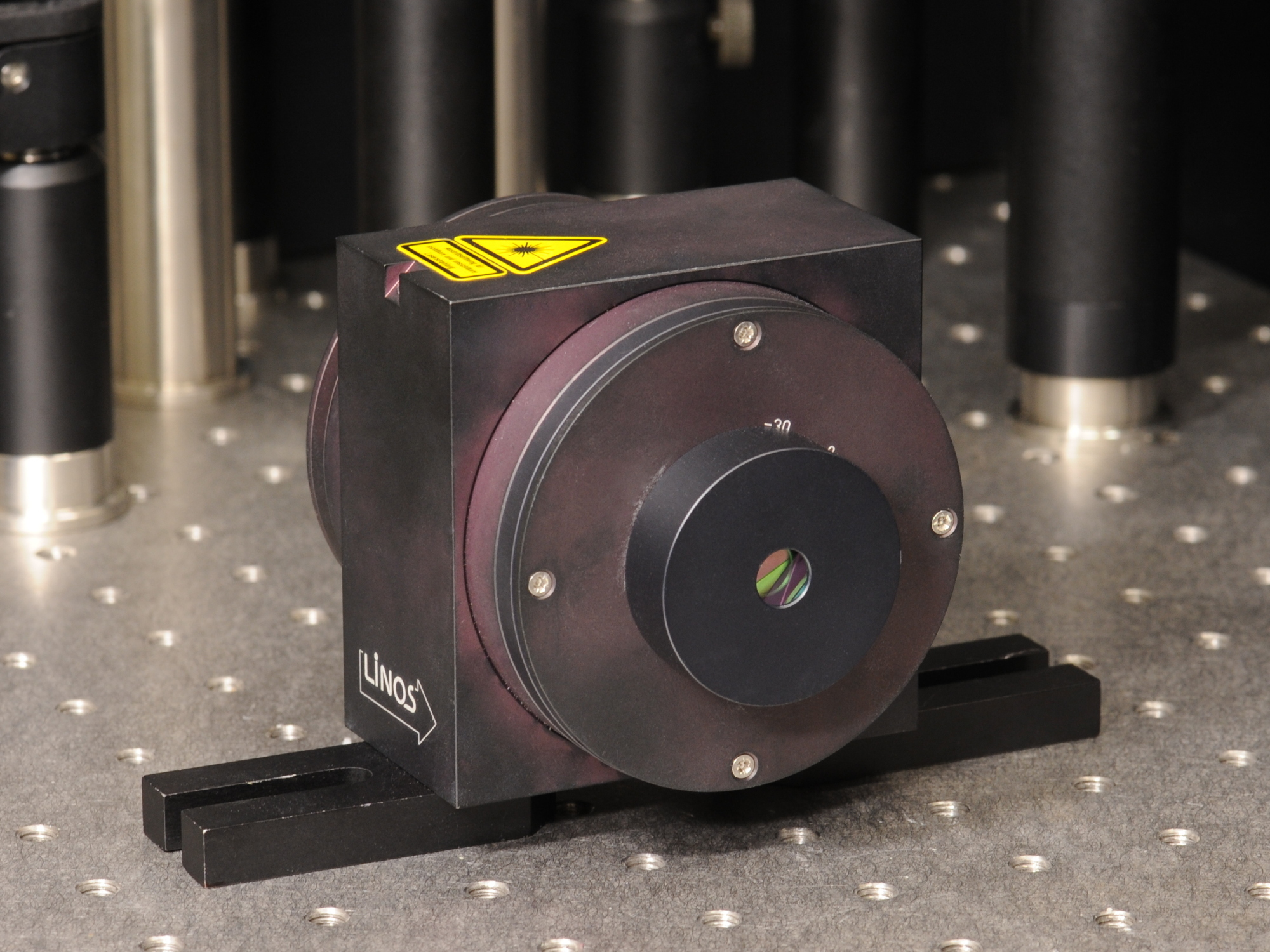
Optical isolator for laser experiments

An optical isolator, or optical diode, is an optical component which allows the transmission of light in only one direction. It is typically used to prevent unwanted feedback into an optical oscillator, such as a laser cavity.

The operation of conventional optical isolators relies on the Faraday effect (which in turn is produced by magneto-optic effect), which is used in the main component, the Faraday rotator. However, integrated isolators which do not rely on magnetism have been made in recent years too.

== Theory ==
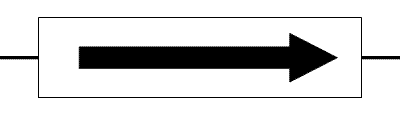
Figure 1: The optical circuit symbol for an isolator

Faraday effect

The main component of the optical isolator is the Faraday rotator. The magnetic field, $B$, applied to the Faraday rotator causes a rotation in the polarization of the light due to the Faraday effect. The angle of rotation, $\beta$, is given by,

$$\beta=\nu B d\,$$,

where, $\nu$ is the Verdet constant of the material (amorphous or crystalline solid, or liquid, or crystalline liquid, or vaprous, or gaseous) of which the rotator is made, and $d$ is the length of the rotator. This is shown in Figure 2. Specifically for an optical isolator, the values are chosen to give a rotation of 45°.

It has been shown that a crucial requirement for any kind of optical isolator (not only the Faraday isolator) is some kind of non-reciprocal optics

== Polarization dependent isolator ==
Figure 2: Faraday isolator allows the transmission of light in only one direction. It is made of three parts, an input polarizer, a Faraday rotator and an analyzer.

The polarization dependent isolator, or Faraday isolator, is made of three parts, an input polarizer (polarized vertically), a Faraday rotator, and an output polarizer, called an analyzer (polarized at 45°).

Light traveling in the forward direction becomes polarized vertically by the input polarizer. The Faraday rotator will rotate the polarization by 45°. The analyzer then enables the light to be transmitted through the isolator.

Light traveling in the backward direction becomes polarized at 45° by the analyzer. The Faraday rotator will again rotate the polarization by 45°. This means the light is polarized horizontally (the direction of rotation is not sensitive to the direction of propagation). Since the polarizer is vertically aligned, the light will be extinguished.

Figure 2 shows a Faraday rotator with an input polarizer, and an output analyzer. For a polarization dependent isolator, the angle between the polarizer and the analyzer, $\beta$, is set to 45°. The Faraday rotator is chosen to give a 45° rotation.

Polarization dependent isolators are typically used in free space optical systems. This is because the polarization of the source is typically maintained by the system. In optical fibre systems, the polarization direction is typically dispersed in non polarization maintaining systems. Hence the angle of polarization will lead to a loss.

== Polarization independent isolator ==
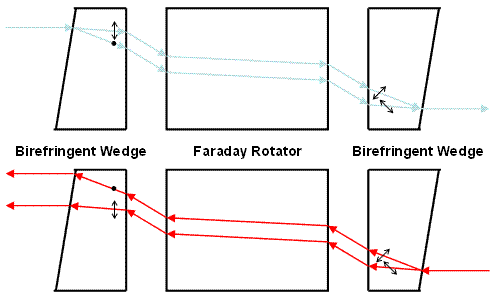
Figure 3: Polarization independent isolator

The polarization independent isolator is made of three parts, an input birefringent wedge (with its ordinary polarization direction vertical and its extraordinary polarization direction horizontal), a Faraday rotator, and an output birefringent wedge (with its ordinary polarization direction at 45°, and its extraordinary polarization direction at −45°).

Light traveling in the forward direction is split by the input birefringent wedge into its vertical (0°) and horizontal (90°) components, called the ordinary ray (o-ray) and the extraordinary ray (e-ray) respectively. The Faraday rotator rotates both the o-ray and e-ray by 45°. This means the o-ray is now at 45°, and the e-ray is at −45°. The output birefringent wedge then recombines the two components.

Light traveling in the backward direction is separated into the o-ray at 45, and the e-ray at −45° by the birefringent wedge. The Faraday Rotator again rotates both the rays by 45°. Now the o-ray is at 90°, and the e-ray is at 0°. Instead of being focused by the second birefringent wedge, the rays diverge.

Typically collimators are used on either side of the isolator. In the transmitted direction the beam is split and then combined and focused into the output collimator. In the isolated direction the beam is split, and then diverged, so it does not focus at the collimator.

Figure 3 shows the propagation of light through a polarization independent isolator. The forward travelling light is shown in blue, and the backward propagating light is shown in red. The rays were traced using an ordinary refractive index of 2, and an extraordinary refractive index of 3. The wedge angle is 7°.

== The Faraday rotator ==
The most important optical element in an isolator is the Faraday rotator. The characteristics that one looks for in a Faraday rotator optic include a high Verdet constant, low absorption coefficient, low non-linear refractive index and high damage threshold. Also, to prevent self-focusing and other thermal related effects, the optic should be as short as possible. The two most commonly used materials for the 700–1100 nm range are terbium-doped borosilicate glass and terbium gallium garnet crystal (TGG). For long distance fibre communication, typically at 1310 nm or 1550 nm, yttrium iron garnet crystals are used (YIG). Commercial YIG based Faraday isolators reach isolations higher than 30 dB.

Optical isolators are different from 1/4 wave plate based isolators because the Faraday rotator provides non-reciprocal rotation while maintaining linear polarization. That is, the polarization rotation due to the Faraday rotator is always in the same relative direction. So in the forward direction, the rotation is positive 45°. In the reverse direction, the rotation is −45°. This is due to the change in the relative magnetic field direction, positive one way, negative the other. This then adds to a total of 90° when the light travels in the forward direction and then the negative direction. This allows the higher isolation to be achieved.

== Optical isolators and thermodynamics ==
It might seem at first glance that a device that allows light to flow in only one direction would violate Kirchhoff's law and the second law of thermodynamics, by allowing light energy to flow from a cold object to a hot object and blocking it in the other direction, but the violation is avoided because the isolator must absorb (not reflect) the light from the hot object and will eventually reradiate it to the cold one. Attempts to re-route the photons back to their source unavoidably involve creating a route by which other photons can travel from the hot body to the cold one, avoiding the paradox.

== See also ==
- Isolator (microwave)
