= YIG sphere =

Magnetic device

Simplified schematics of YIG-resonator coupling to microstrip network

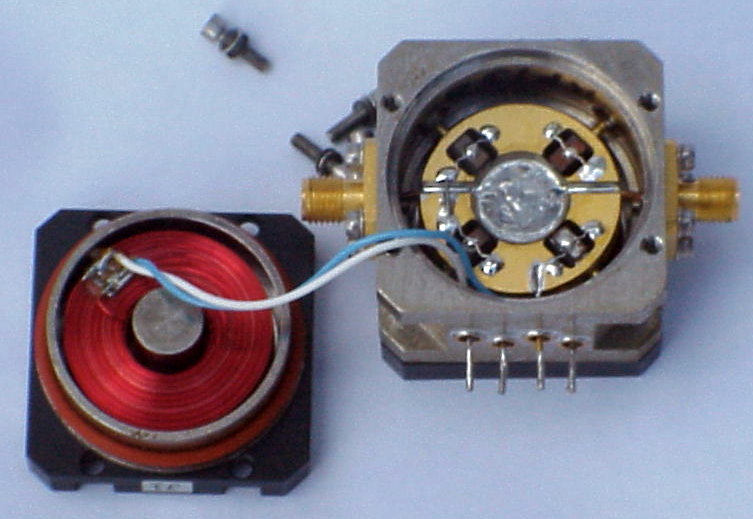
YIG filter partially disassembled. The electromagnet is on the left. The module with YIG sphere and input and output coils is on the right.

Yttrium iron garnet spheres (YIG spheres) serve as magnetically tunable filters and resonators for microwave frequencies. YIG filters are used for their high Q factors, typically between 100 and 200 (though spheres made with ultrapure material are reported to reach 5000 at low temperatures). A sphere made from a single crystal of synthetic yttrium iron garnet acts as a resonator.

The field from an electromagnet changes the resonance frequency of the sphere and hence the frequency it will allow to pass. The advantage of this type of filter is that the garnet can be tuned over a very wide frequency range by varying the strength of the magnetic field. Some filters can be tuned from 3 GHz up to 50 GHz.

Yttrium Iron Garnet sphere in a disassembled oscillator

== Construction ==
The YIG spheres themselves are on the order of 0.5 mm in diameter and are manufactured from slightly larger cubes of diced material by tumbling, as is done in the manufacture of jewelry.

The garnet is mounted on a ceramic rod, and a pair of small loops around the sphere couple fields into and out of the sphere; the loops are half-turns, positioned at right-angles to each other to prevent direct electromagnetic coupling between them and each is grounded at one end.

The input and output coils are oriented at right angles to one another around the YIG crystal. They are cross-coupled when energized by the ferrimagnetic resonance frequency, which depends on the external magnetic field supplied by an electromagnet.

YIG filters usually consist of several coupled stages, each stage consisting of a sphere and a pair of loops.

== Applications ==
YIG filters are often used as preselectors. YIG filters tuned by a sweep current are used in spectrum analyzers. Another YIG application is YIG oscillators, where the sphere acts as a tunable frequency-determining element. It is coupled to an amplifier which provides the required feedback for oscillation. An emerging application for the YIG spheres is quantum computing based on magnons.
