= Lightpath (optical network) =

Path between two nodes in an optical network

In optical networking, a lightpath is a path between two nodes in an optical network between which light passes through unmodified.

== Description ==
When a lightpath can be established between source and destination node endpoints, the connection is totally optical and avoids bandwidth throttling by intermediate electronic conversions and processing. A lightpath passing through an optical add-drop multiplexer (OADM) is known as a cut-through lightpath. A lightpath added or dropped at an OADM is known as an added/dropped lightpath.

== Semi-lightpath ==
Where endpoints are connected by a series of lightpaths with the intermediate nodes only changing the light wavelength at the junctions, this may be referred to as a semi-lightpath.

== See also ==
- Wavelength switched optical network
- Multicast lightpaths
- Network Description Language
