= Multicast lightpaths =

Type of computer communication

Multicast connections affected by fiber cut

A multicast session requires a "point-to-multipoint" connection from a source node to multiple destination nodes. The source node is known as the root. The destination nodes are known as leaves. In the modern era, it is important to protect multicast connections in an optical mesh network. Recently, multicast applications have gained popularity as they are important to protecting critical sessions against failures such as fiber cuts, hardware faults, and natural disasters.

== Multicast applications ==
Multicast applications may include multimedia, medical imaging, digital audio, HDTV, video conferencing, interactive distance learning, and distributed games.

== Multi-casting switch architecture ==
In order to support multi-casting, the WDM network requires multicast-capable wavelength-routing switches at the network node. These switches are capable of replicating data streams from one input port to multiple output ports. There are two types of switch architectures that are usually used:

- The first type of switch architecture is an opaque switch architecture which utilizes electronic cross-connects with optical-electrical-optical (OEO) conversion.
- The other is transparent switch architecture which utilizes all optical cross-connects (OXCs).

== Multicast lightpaths protection ==
Multicast lightpaths protection refers to the network's prompt response to reroute traffic onto an alternative path in the event of a failure.

In a dedicated backup path, resources are exclusively allocated to a single connection and not shared with other connections along the backup path.

In a shared backup path, resources may be shared between multiple backup paths for different connections.

== Protecting multicast sessions ==
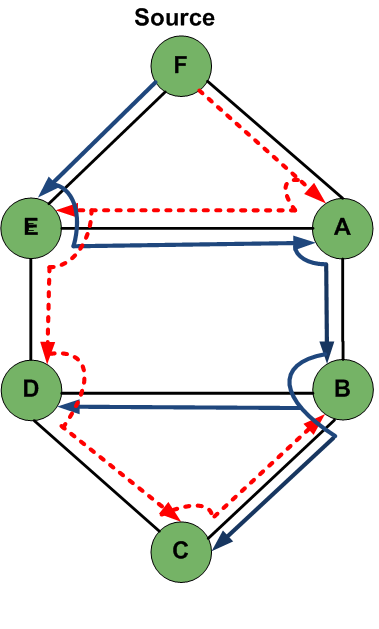
Link disjoint backup tree.

Several protection schemes have been proposed in the literature to protect the multicast connections. The simplest idea to protect the multicast tree from single fiber failure is to compute a link disjoint backup tree. In a link disjoint backup tree, a multicast session from source node F to destination nodes A, B, C, D and E forms a light tree. F is the root and the remaining nodes are the leaves. The primary light tree is shown in solid lines and (directed-link-disjoint) the back up light tree is shown in dotted lines carrying traffic from source node to destinations.

The ring based approach is also proposed to protect multicast session.

The segment protection scheme is another way to protect multicast connections. A segment in a multicast tree is defined as the sequence of edges from the source or any splitting node (on a tree) to a leaf node or to a downstream splitting node. A destination node is always considered as a segment end node because it is either a leaf node in a tree or a splitting node.

A multicast protection scheme through spanning paths is also one of the key approaches to protecting multicast sessions. A spanning path in a multicast tree is defined as a path from a leaf node to any other leaf node in the light tree. The scheme derives backup paths for every spanning path in the multicast tree.

== Concept of DBPP and SBPP on multicast connections ==
Dedicated backup path protection (DBPP) for multicast connections: Depending on the network topology, a dedicated backup path concept can be applied for multicast traffic. A dedicated backup path protection is a multicast session from source node F to destination nodes A, B, C, D, and E which form the light tree. A dedicated backup path protection scheme can be applied to protect multicast traffic from link failure. This is easy to achieve with one-to-one protection where the dedicated backup path is already provisioned and traffic is simply switched to it on failure.

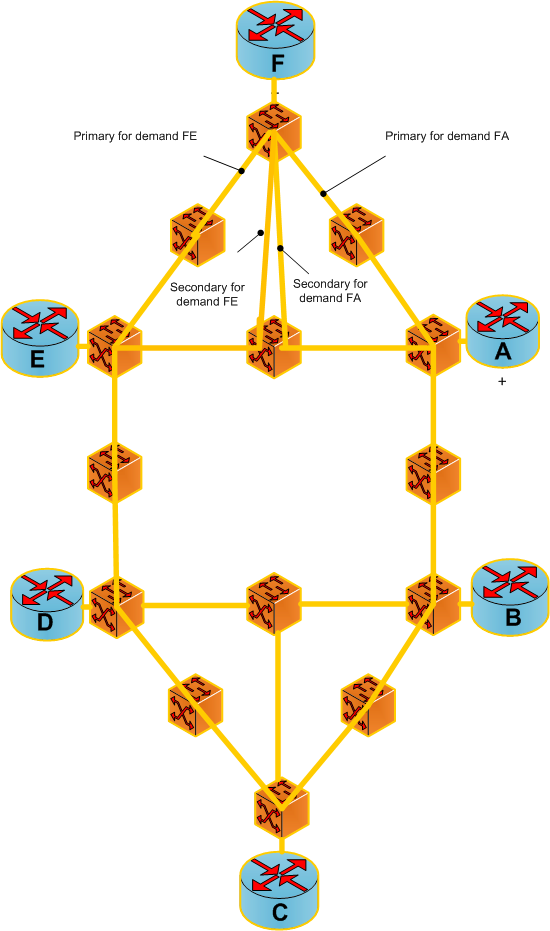
Dedicated backup path protection

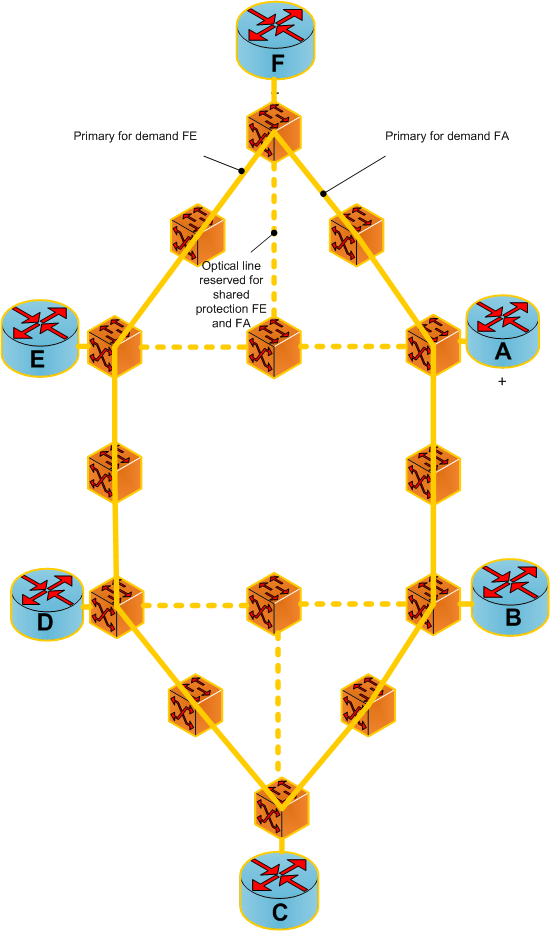
Shared backup path protection before failure

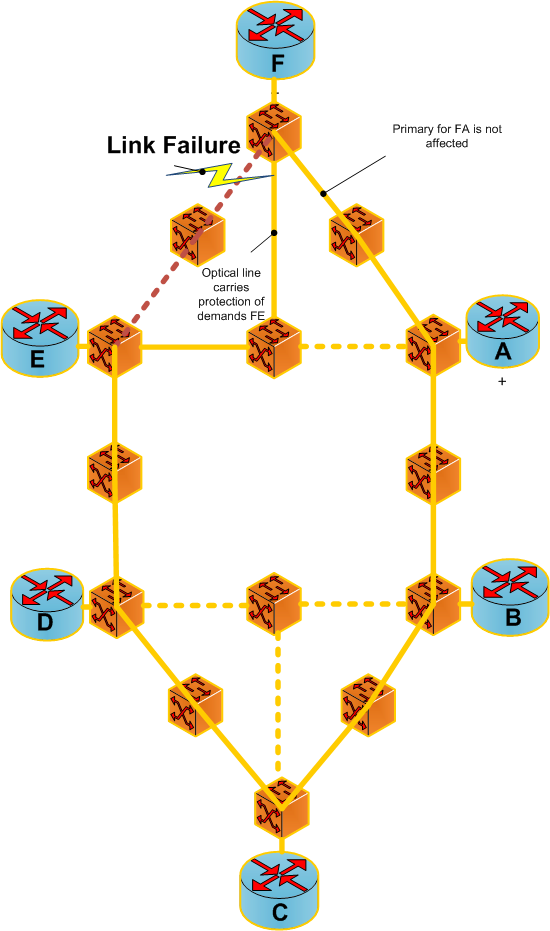
Shared backup path protection after failure

Shared backup path protection (SBPP) for multicast connections: The SBPP technique can be used for multicast connections at the optical layer because of its resource efficiency, due to the fact that the backup paths can share wavelength channels on links while their corresponding primary paths are link disjoint. Paths can share links with working paths and protection paths of other leaves. In a shared backup path protection before failure FE and FA are primary paths. The optical line is reserved for shared protection of both FE and FA.

Path protection technique for multicast connections (multiple unicast connections):

| Key features | Dedicated backup path protection | Shared backup path protection |
|---|---|---|
| Reliability | Highly reliable | Less reliable |
| Cross connect | Cross connect established before failure | Cross connect established after failure |
| Cost | Cost is higher than SBPP | Less than DBPP |

== Importance ==
Protection schemes for multicast connections are important for the following reasons:

1. Loss of connectivity: network failures such as fiber cuts in a communication network occur often enough to cause service disruption, and lead to significant information loss in the absence of adequate backup mechanisms.
2. SLA: it is important for providers to follow SLAs and guaranteed service. It is important to protect multicast connections to maintain the SLA.
3. Business reputation: network availability is one of the key aspects of multicasting connections. A company loses money and reputation when its network fails.

== See also ==
- Availability
- IP multicast
- Optical add-drop multiplexer
- Optical mesh network
- Optical transport network
- Unicast
