= QMR effect =

Quadratic magnetic rotation (also known as QMR or QMR effect) is a type of magneto-optic effect, discovered in the mid 1980s by a team of Ukrainian physicists. QMR, like the Faraday effect, establishes a relationship between the magnetic field and rotation of polarization of the plane of linearly polarized light. In contrast to the Faraday effect, QMR originates from the quadratic proportionality between the angle of the rotation of the plane of polarization and the strength of the magnetic field. Mostly QMR can be observed in the transverse geometry when the vector of the magnetic field strength is perpendicular to the direction of light propagation.

The first evidence of QMR effect was obtained in the antiferromagnetic crystal of cobalt fluoride in 1985.

Considerations of the symmetry of the media, light and axial vector of the magnetic field forbid QMR in non-magnetic or magnetically disordered media. Onsager's reciprocal relations generalized for magnetically ordered media eliminate symmetry restrictions for QMR in the media which have lost the center of anti-inversion as an operation of symmetry at an ordering of its magnetic subsystem. Despite the fact that some crystal groups of symmetry are devoid of the center of anti-inversion, they also don’t have QMR because of action of other operators of symmetry. They are eleven groups without the center of anti-inversion 432, 43'm, m3m, 422, 4mm, 4'2m, 4/mmm, 622, 6mm, 6'm2 and 6/mmm. Accordingly, the rest of groups of crystal symmetry where QMR can be observed constitutes 27 antiferromagnetic and 31 pyromagnetic crystal classes.

QMR is described by fourth-order c-tensor which is antisymmetrical as to the first two indices.

== See also ==
- Faraday effect
- Magneto-optic effect
