= Chromatic (disambiguation) =

Chromatic, a word ultimately derived from the Greek noun χρῶμα (khrṓma), which means "complexion" or "color", and then from the Greek adjective χρωματικός (khrōmatikós; "colored"), may refer to:

== In music ==
- Chromatic scale, the western-tempered twelve-tone scale
- Chromatic chord, chords built from tones chromatically altered from the native scale of the musical composition
- Chromaticism, the use of chromatic scales, chords, and modulations
- Total chromatic, the use of all twelve pitches of the chromatic scale in tonal music
- Chromatic fantasia, a specific form of fantasia originating in sixteenth century Europe
- The Chromatic button accordion
- The chromatic harmonica
- Chromatic genus, a genus of divisions of the tetrachord characterized by an upper interval of a minor third
- Diatonic and chromatic, as a property of several structures, genres, and other features in music, often contrasted with diatonic
- Chromatics (band), an American electronic music band
- Chromatica, the sixth studio album by American singer Lady Gaga
- "Chromatic", a song by +/- from You Are Here, 2003

== In optics, vision, and color ==
- Colorimetry, the science of color is sometimes called chromatics
- Chromaticity, the quality of a color as determined by its "purity" and dominant wavelength
- Chromatic aberration, departures from perfect imaging in optics systems due to dispersion
- Chromatic dispersion, the dispersion of light due to differing refraction index for different wavelengths
- RG Chromaticity, a two-dimensional color space in which there is no color intensity information
- Chromatic adaptation, the ability for some organisms to perceive objects similarly in varying lighting conditions

== In mathematics ==
- Chromatic polynomial, a polynomial which encodes the number of different ways to vertex color a graph using n colors
- Chromatic numbering
- Chromatic index
- Acyclic chromatic number
- Strong chromatic number
- Fractional chromatic number
- Vertex chromatic number

== Other uses ==
- Von Luschan's chromatic scale, a method for classifying skin color
- Chromatic dragon in Dungeons & Dragons
- chromatic (programmer), a Perl programmer and writer
- Chromatics Inc., a manufacturer of color graphics display systems
- chromatic, of biological material, the ability to take up staining

== See also ==
=== In music ===
- Twelve tone technique
- Serialism
- Equal temperament
- Sequence

=== In Ancient Greek and Byzantine music ===
- Diatonic
- Enharmonic
- Byzantine Music
- Maqam (disambiguation)

=== In optics, vision and color ===
- Color
- International Commission on Illumination, the international authority on light, illumination, colour, and colour spaces.
