= Reconfigurable optical add-drop multiplexer =

Optical network component

In optical communication, a reconfigurable optical add-drop multiplexer (ROADM) is a form of optical add-drop multiplexer that adds the ability to remotely switch traffic from a wavelength-division multiplexing (WDM) system at the wavelength layer. This is achieved through the use of a wavelength selective switching module. This allows individual or multiple wavelengths carrying data channels to be added and/or dropped from a transport fiber without the need to convert the signals on all of the WDM channels to electronic signals and back again to optical signals.

The main advantages of the ROADM are:

- The planning of the entire bandwidth assignment need not be carried out during initial deployment of a system. The configuration can be done as and when required without affecting traffic already passing through the ROADM.
- Allows for remote configuration and reconfiguration.
- As it is not clear beforehand where a signal can be potentially routed, there is a need for power balancing of these signals. ROADMs allow for automatic power balancing.

ROADM functionality originally appeared in long-haul dense wavelength division multiplexing (DWDM) equipment, but by 2005, it began to appear in metro optical systems because of the need to build out major metropolitan networks in order to deal with the traffic driven by the increasing demand for packet-based services.

The switching or reconfiguration functions of a ROADM can be achieved using a variety of switching technologies, including microelectromechanical systems (MEMS), liquid crystal, thermo optic and beam-steering switches in planar waveguide circuits, and tunable optical filter technology. MEMS and liquid crystal technologies are the most widely used. ROADMs were first introduced in 2002 with the introduction of DWDM. ROADMs can be directionless, colorless, contentionless, and gridless. Directionless means that any wavelength can be dropped from any fiber, and any wavelength or signal can be sent to any port in the ROADM. Colorless implies every port in the ROADM can handle or accept any wavelength or color of light. Contentionless means several identical wavelengths or signals can be dropped from several ports at the same time. Gridless means that the ROADM can handle frequencies or signals that aren't precisely 50 GHz apart from each other. This is relevant because 50 GHz spacing has been traditionally used in fiber optic communications.

== See also ==
- Optical mesh network
