= Optical circulator =

Optical device in which light entering any port exits from the next

Optical Circulator symbol

An optical circulator is a three- or four-port optical device designed such that light entering any port exits from the next. This means that if light enters port 1 it is emitted from port 2, but if some of the emitted light is reflected back to the circulator, it does not come out of port 1 but instead exits from port 3. This is analogous to the operation of an electronic circulator. Fiber-optic circulators are used to separate optical signals that travel in opposite directions in an optical fiber, for example to achieve bi-directional transmission over a single fiber. Because of their high isolation of the input and reflected optical powers and their low insertion loss, optical circulators are widely used in advanced fiber-optic communications and fiber-optic sensor applications.

Optical circulators are non-reciprocal optics, which means that changes in the properties of light passing through the device are not reversed when the light passes through in the opposite direction. This can only happen when the symmetry of the system is broken, for example by an external magnetic field. A Faraday rotator is another example of a non-reciprocal optical device, and indeed it is possible to construct an optical circulator based on a Faraday rotator.

== History ==
In 1965, Ribbens reported an early form of optical circulator that utilized a Nicol prism with a Faraday rotator. With the advent of fiber and guided-wave optics, waveguide-integrable and polarization-independent optical circulators were later introduced. The concept was later extended to silicon photonic waveguide systems. In 2016, Scheucher et al. have demonstrated a fiber-integrated optical circulator whose nonreciprocal behavior originated from the chiral interaction between a single ^{85}Rb atom and the confined light in a whispering-gallery mode microresonator. The routing direction of the device is controlled by the internal quantum state of the atom and the device is able to route individual photons.

In 2013, Davoyan and Engheta proposed a nanoscale plasmonic Y-circulator based on three dielectric waveguides interconnected with a magneto-optical junction with plasmonic nanorods.

== See also ==
- Optical isolator
