= Émile Verdet =

French physicist (1824–1866)

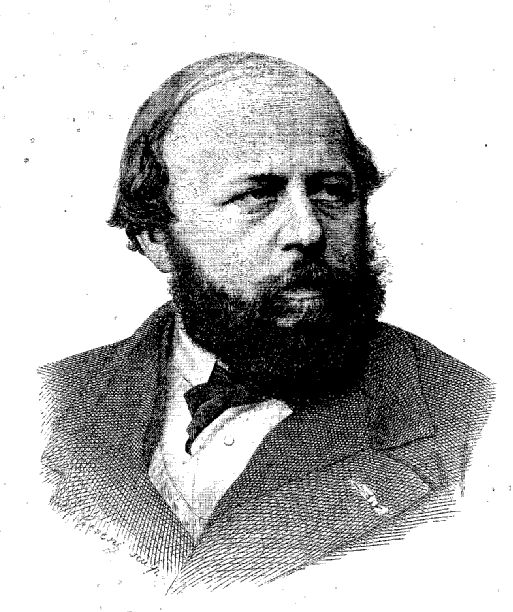
Emile Verdet

Marcel Émile Verdet (French pronunciation: [maʁsɛl emil vɛʁdɛ]; 13 March 1824 – 3 June 1866) was a French physicist. He worked in magnetism and optics, editing the works of Augustin-Jean Fresnel. Verdet did much to champion the early theory of the conservation of energy in France through his editorial supervision of the Annales de chimie et de physique.

The Verdet constant is named after him.

== Books by Emile Verdet ==
- Leçons d'optique physique. Tome I (G. Masson, 1872)
- Leçons d'optique physique. Tome II (G. Masson, 1872)
- Recherches sur les propriétés optiques développées dans les corps transparents par l'action du magnétisme (Mallet-Bachelier, 1854)
- Théorie mécanique de la chaleur. Tome I (G. Masson, 1878)
- Théorie mécanique de la chaleur. Tome II (G. Masson, 1878)
- Conférences de physique faites à l'Ecole Normale (Masson, 1872)
- Conférences de physique faites à l'Ecole Normale. Deuxième partie (Masson, 1872)
