= Verdet constant =

Optical property

The Verdet constant is an optical property named after the French physicist Émile Verdet. It describes the strength of the Faraday effect for a particular material. For a constant magnetic field parallel to the path of the light, it can be calculated as

$$\theta = V B L,$$

where $\theta$ is the angle between the starting and ending polarizations, $V$ is the Verdet constant, $B$ is the strength of the magnetic flux density, and $L$ is the path length in the material.

The Verdet constant of a material is wavelength-dependent and for most materials is extremely small. It is strongest in substances containing paramagnetic ions such as terbium. The highest Verdet constants in bulk media are found in terbium-doped dense flint glasses or in crystals of terbium gallium garnet (TGG). These materials have excellent transparency properties and high damage thresholds for laser radiation. Atomic vapours, however, can have Verdet constants which are orders of magnitude larger than TGG, but only over a very narrow wavelength range. Alkali vapours can therefore be used as an optical isolator or as an extremely sensitive magnetometer.

The Faraday effect is chromatic (i.e. it depends on wavelength), and therefore the Verdet constant is quite a strong function of wavelength. At 632.8 nm, the Verdet constant for TGG is reported to be −134 rad/(T·m), whereas at 1064 nm it falls to −40 rad/(T·m). This behavior means that the devices manufactured with a certain degree of rotation at one wavelength will produce much less rotation at longer wavelengths. Many Faraday rotators and isolators are adjustable by varying the degree to which the active TGG rod is inserted into the magnetic field of the device. In this way, the device can be tuned for use with a range of lasers within the design range of the device. Truly broadband sources (such as ultrashort-pulse lasers and the tunable vibronic lasers) will not see the same rotation across the whole wavelength band.
