= Otto Sackur =

German chemist (1880–1914)

Otto Sackur (28 September 1880 in Breslau, Germany – 17 December 1914 in Berlin, Germany) was a German physical chemist.

He is known for the development of the Sackur–Tetrode equation, which he developed independently of Hugo Tetrode. His and Tetrode's names are also combined to name the Sackur–Tetrode constant derived using the equation.

Sackur studied at the University of Breslau, receiving his doctorate there in 1901 under Richard Abegg. He received his Habilitation in 1905 under Richard Abegg. He then worked in London before joining the Fritz Haber Institute in Berlin, becoming the head of the physical chemistry department early 1914. He had good relations with Clara Immerwahr. They studied as doctoral students together, and Immerwahr was the one who got him the job in the Institute.

After the outbreak of WWI, he was enlisted for military research, and during his free time he carried out experiments on the behavior of gases at low temperatures. During experiments on chemical warfare, he mixed a beaker of dichloromethylamine with cacodyl chloride, and while observing it at eye level, it exploded. The explosion was so powerful that it killed him on site; even Gerhard Leopold Just (1877-1948), an assistant to Haber, lost his right hand in the explosion while trying to save Otto by snatching the exploding beaker.

Haber, Just, and Sackur were back then researching on improvements to the T-Shell, with the aim of finding some chemical that could serve both as an explosive and an irritant. Cacodyl chloride, first synthesized by Robert Bunsen in 1837, fit the description. Indeed, it had scarcely been researched since its discovery precisely because it is highly irritating and explosive.
