= Hugo Tetrode =

Dutch physicist (1895–1931)

Hugo Martin Tetrode (7 March 1895, in Amsterdam – 18 January 1931, in Amstelveen) was a Dutch theoretical physicist who contributed to statistical physics, early quantum theory and quantum mechanics.

In 1912, Tetrode developed the Sackur–Tetrode equation, a quantum mechanical expression of the entropy of an ideal gas. Otto Sackur derived this equation independently around the same time. The Sackur–Tetrode constant, S_{0}/R, is a fundamental physical constant representing the translational contribution to the entropy of an ideal gas at a temperature of 1 K and pressure of 100 kPa, where R is the gas constant.

From Amsterdam, Tetrode corresponded with Albert Einstein, Hendrik Lorentz and Paul Ehrenfest on quantum mechanics and wrote several influential papers on quantum mechanics which were published in the German physics journal Zeitschrift für Physik.

In (Tetrode 1922), he proposed that electromagnetic interactions are direct, time-symmetric actions between particles along lightlike intervals, not mediated by independent fields. An isolated charge does not radiate, because radiation is an interaction between an emitting particle and an absorbing particle. As an example, he suggested that if the sun were the only object in the universe, then it will not radiate. Mathematically, this corresponds to using the symmetric Green function (½ retarded + ½ advanced) for the interaction. Later, Wheeler and Feynman followed his idea in the Wheeler–Feynman time-symmetric theory.

The sun would not radiate if it were alone in space and no other bodies could absorb its radiation. ... If for example I observed through my telescope yesterday evening that star which let us say is 100 light years away, then not only did I know that the light which it allowed to reach my eye was emitted 100 years ago, but also the star or individual atoms of it knew already 100 years ago that I, who then did not even exist, would view it yesterday evening at such and such a time. ... One might accordingly adopt the opinion that the amount of material in the universe determines the rate of emission. Still this is not necessarily so, for two competing absorption centers will not collaborate but will presumably interfere with each other. If only the amount of matter is great enough and is distributed to some extent in all directions, further additions to it may well be without influence. (Tetrode 1922), translated in (Wheeler & Feynman 1945)

In 1928, he published two papers on mathematical extensions to Dirac's quantum theory.

== Life ==
Hugo Tetrode was a member of the rich, prominent Tetrode family. He was the oldest of the three children of Pieter Johan Conrad Tetrode, who served as director of De Nederlandsche Bank (the Dutch national bank) from 1919 to 1934. Tetrode was born in what was then Nieuwer-Amstel, at an address that is now part of Amsterdam; as a child he lived on two of Amsterdam's canals. He had a sister Helena Maria (1897–1982), and a younger brother, Pieter (1902–1973).

Tetrode left for Germany in 1911 to study mathematics, physics and chemistry at the University of Leipzig, but returned to Amsterdam a year later. In 1912, at the age of 17, he published his first research paper in the German physics journal Annalen der Physik. He published a total of six scientific papers, all on topics of statistical physics and quantum mechanics.

He corresponded with Lorentz and Ehrenfest. His ill-health prevented him from contact with the community. He led a withdrawn life; it is said that when Einstein and Ehrenfest tried to visit him in Amsterdam, Tetrode's maid sent them away: Meneer ontvangt niet ("Sir is not receiving [guests]."). As he neared the end of his life, he became increasingly reclusive, until only his sister would contact him.

Tetrode died at the age of 35, unmarried, after contracting tuberculosis. His sister donated his books to the Zeemanlaboratorium.

Pauli commented to Casimir that, "You have some strange owls (merkwürdige Käuze) in the Netherlands. There's Tetrode, for example. He's done excellent work, but nobody knows him, and he doesn't seem to want to know anyone." His most significant contribution was the independent derivation, in 1912, of a quantum mechanical expression for the entropy of an ideal gas, now known as the Sackur–Tetrode equation, which he developed simultaneously with Otto Sackur. His later work on the idea that elementary particles act only on other particles and not on themselves anticipated key concepts in the Wheeler–Feynman absorber theory developed decades later.

== Publications ==
- Tetrode, H. (January 1912). "Die chemische Konstante der Gase und das elementare Wirkungsquantum". Annalen der Physik. 343 (7): 434–442. Bibcode:1912AnP...343..434T. doi:10.1002/andp.19123430708. ISSN 0003-3804.
- Tetrode, H. (1913). "Bemerkungen über die Energieeinhalt einatomiger Gase und über die Quantentheorie für Flüssigkeiten" [Remarks on the energy content of monatomic gases and on the quantum theory for liquids]. Physikalische Zeitschrift (in German). 14: 212–215.
- Tetrode, H. (1915). "Theoretical determination of the entropy constant of gases and liquids" (PDF). Koninklijke Nederlandse Akademie van Wetenschappen, Proceedings Series B Physical Sciences. B. 17: 1167–1184. Bibcode:1915KNAB...17.1167T.
- Tetrode, H. (December 1922). "Über den Wirkungszusammenhang der Welt. Eine Erweiterung der klassischen Dynamik". Zeitschrift für Physik (in German). 10 (1): 317–328. Bibcode:1922ZPhy...10..317T. doi:10.1007/BF01332574. ISSN 1434-6001.
- Tetrode, H. (May 1928). "Allgemein-relativistische Quantentheorie des Elektrons". Zeitschrift für Physik (in German). 50 (5–6): 336–346. Bibcode:1928ZPhy...50..336T. doi:10.1007/BF01347512. ISSN 1434-6001.
- Tetrode, H. (November 1928). "Der Impuls-Energiesatz in der Diracschen Quantentheorie des Elektrons". Zeitschrift für Physik (in German). 49 (11–12): 858–864. Bibcode:1928ZPhy...49..858T. doi:10.1007/BF01328632. ISSN 1434-6001.

== See also ==
- Fokker-Tetrode dynamics
- Tetrode tensor
- Wheeler–Feynman absorber theory

== Sources ==
- D. Dieks and W. J. Slooten, "Historic Papers in Physics – The Case of Hugo Martin Tetrode, 1895-1931", Czechoslovak Journal of Physics B 36, 39-42 (1986)
- Casimir, H. B. G. (1984-02-23). "Hugo Martin Tetrode, een vergeten genie" [Hugo Martin Tetrode, a forgotten genius]. NRC Handelsblad (in Dutch). Archived from the original on 2025-09-01.
- (in Dutch) Prof. H.B.G. Casimir, "Hugo Tetrode (1895-1931); een geniale outsider". Mens en Kosmos, Meulenhoff 1983, pag. 180-189 (Dutch)
- Frederik W. Wiegel, Introduction to Path-integral Methods in Physics and Polymer Science. World Scientific, 1986
