= Sackur–Tetrode equation =

Expression of monatomic ideal gas entropy

The Sackur–Tetrode equation is an expression for the entropy of a monatomic ideal gas.

It is named for Hugo Martin Tetrode (1895–1931) and Otto Sackur (1880–1914), who developed it independently as a solution of Boltzmann's gas statistics and entropy equations, at about the same time in 1912.

== Formula ==
The Sackur–Tetrode equation expresses the entropy $S$ of a monatomic ideal gas in terms of its thermodynamic state—specifically, its volume $V$, internal energy $U$, and the number of particles $N$:

$$\frac{S}{k_{\rm B} N} = \ln
\left[ \frac VN \left(\frac{4\pi m}{3h^2}\frac UN\right)^{3/2}\right]+
{\frac 52}
,$$
where $k_\mathrm{B}$ is the Boltzmann constant, $m$ is the mass of a gas particle and $h$ is the Planck constant.

The equation can also be expressed in terms of the thermal wavelength $\Lambda$:
$$\frac{S}{k_{\rm B}N} =  \ln\left(\frac{V}{N\Lambda^3}\right)+\frac{5}{2} ,$$

Entropy vs temperature curves of classical and quantum ideal gases (Fermi gas, Bose gas) in three dimensions. Though all are in close agreement at high temperature, they disagree at low temperatures where the classical entropy (Sackur–Tetrode equation) starts to approach negative values.

The above expressions assume that the gas is in the classical regime and is described by Maxwell–Boltzmann statistics (with "correct Boltzmann counting"). From the definition of the thermal wavelength, this means the Sackur–Tetrode equation is valid only when
$$\frac{V}{N\Lambda^3}\gg 1 .$$

The entropy predicted by the Sackur–Tetrode equation approaches negative infinity as the temperature approaches zero. At low temperatures intermolecular forces and quantum statistical effects become significant and the ideal gas assumptions become less applicable.

== Derivation ==
For a derivation of the Sackur–Tetrode equation, see the Gibbs paradox. For the constraints placed upon the entropy of an ideal gas by thermodynamics alone, see the ideal gas article.

== Sackur–Tetrode constant ==
The Sackur–Tetrode constant, written S_{0}/R, is equal to S/k_{B}N evaluated at a temperature of T = 1 kelvin, at standard pressure (100 kPa or 101.325 kPa, to be specified), for one mole of an ideal gas composed of particles of mass equal to the atomic mass constant (m_{u} = 1.66053906892(52)×10^{−27} kg). Its 2018 CODATA recommended value is:

S_{0}/R = −1.15170753706(45) for p^{~~o~~} = 100 kPa
S_{0}/R = −1.16487052358(45) for p^{~~o~~} = 101.325 kPa.

== Information-theoretic interpretation ==
In addition to the thermodynamic perspective of entropy, the tools of information theory can be used to provide an information perspective of entropy. In particular, it is possible to derive the Sackur–Tetrode equation in information-theoretic terms. The overall entropy is represented as the sum of four individual entropies, i.e., four distinct sources of missing information. These are positional uncertainty, momenta uncertainty, the quantum mechanical uncertainty principle, and the indistinguishability of the particles. Summing the four pieces, the Sackur–Tetrode equation is then given as

$$\begin{align}
\frac{S}{k_{\rm B} N} & = [\ln V] + \left[\frac 32 \ln\left(2\pi m e k_{\rm B} T\right)\right] + [ -3\ln h] + \left[-\frac{\ln N!}{N}\right] \\
& \approx \ln \left[\frac{V}{N} \left(\frac{2\pi m k_{\rm B} T}{h^2}\right)^{\frac 32}\right]  +  \frac 52
\end{align}$$

The derivation uses Stirling's approximation, $\ln N! \approx N \ln N - N$. Strictly speaking, the use of dimensioned arguments to the logarithms is incorrect, however their use is a "shortcut" made for simplicity. If each logarithmic argument were divided by an unspecified standard value expressed in terms of an unspecified standard mass, length and time, these standard values would cancel in the final result, yielding the same conclusion. The individual entropy terms will not be absolute, but will rather depend upon the standards chosen, and will differ with different standards by an additive constant.
