= Faraday rotator =

Optical polarization rotator based on the Faraday effect

Polarization mechanism due to the Faraday effect. The field lines are usually closed through a permanent magnet around the rotator.

A Faraday rotator is a polarization rotator based on the Faraday effect, a magneto-optic effect involving transmission of light through a material when a longitudinal static magnetic field is present. The state of polarization (such as the axis of linear polarization or the orientation of elliptical polarization) is rotated as the wave traverses the device, which is explained by a slight difference in the phase velocity between the left and right circular polarizations. Thus it is an example of circular birefringence, as is optical activity, but involves a material only having this property in the presence of a magnetic field.

== Mechanism ==
Circular birefringence, involving a difference in propagation between opposite circular polarizations, is distinct from linear birefringence (or simply birefringence, when the term is not further specified) which also transforms a wave's polarization but not through a simple rotation.

The polarization state is rotated in proportion to the applied longitudinal magnetic field according to:

$$\beta = VBd \!$$

where $\beta$ is the angle of rotation (in radians), $B$ is the magnetic flux density in the direction of propagation (in teslas), $d$ is the length of the path (in metres) where the light and magnetic field interact, and $V$ is the Verdet constant for the material. This empirical proportionality constant (in units of radians per tesla per metre, rad/(T·m)) varies with wavelength and temperature and is tabulated for various materials.

Faraday rotation is a rare example of non-reciprocal optical propagation. Although reciprocity is a basic tenet of electromagnetics, the apparent non-reciprocity in this case is a result of not considering the static magnetic field but only the resulting device. Unlike the rotation in an optically active medium such as a sugar solution, reflecting a polarized beam back through the same Faraday rotator does not undo the polarization change the beam underwent in its forward pass through the medium, but actually doubles it. Then by implementing a Faraday rotator with a rotation of 45°, inadvertent downstream reflections from a linearly polarized source will return with the polarization rotated by 90° and can be simply blocked by a polarizer; this is the basis of optical isolators used to prevent undesired reflections from disrupting an upstream optical system (particularly a laser).

The difference between Faraday rotation and other polarization rotation mechanisms is as follows. In an optically active medium, the polarization direction twists or rotates in the same sense (e.g. like a right-handed screw) for either direction, thus in the case of a plane reflection the original rotation is reversed, returning the incident beam to its original polarization. On the other hand, in a Faraday rotator, passage of light in opposite directions experience a magnetic field in opposite directions relative to the propagation direction, and since the rotation (relative to the direction of propagation) is determined by the magnetic field (see above equation), that rotation is opposite between the two propagating directions.

== Applications ==
Faraday rotators are crucial in the construction of optical isolators, used in telecommunications infrastructure. At the micrometer pathlength scale, Faraday rotators are used in the detection of sensitive magnetic fields. Implementations include detection of superconducting vortices and ferromagnetic domains, and commercially, subsurface aircraft fuselage cracks and destroyed firearm serial numbers.

== See also ==
- Atomic line filter
