= Cotton (surname) =

Cotton is an Anglo-Saxon surname, derived from place names such as Coton, Cottam and Cotham, which in turn are named for the Old English word cot meaning cottage or hut, and as an (unrelated) French surname, from the diminutive of cotte, meaning coat of mail. Notable people with the surname include:

== Athletes ==
- Amy Cotton (born 1980), Canadian judoka
- Bryce Cotton (born 1992), American professional basketball player
- Coby and Cory Cotton (born 1987), co-creators of Dude Perfect
- Craig Cotton (1947–2013), American football player
- Fran Cotton (born 1947), rugby footballer of the 1970s and 1980s
- Harold Cotton (cricketer) (1914–1966), Australian cricketer
- Harold Cotton (ice hockey) (1902–1984), Canadian ice hockey player
- Henry Cotton (golfer) (1907–1987), English golfer
- James Cotton (basketball) (born 1975), American basketball player
- James Cotton (gridiron football) (born 1978), American football player
- Jeff Cotton (American football) (born 1997), American football player
- Jharel Cotton (born 1992), American baseball player
- Keith Cotton (born 1942), rugby footballer of the 1960s and 1970s
- Lester Cotton (born 1996), American football player
- Paris Cotton (born 1989), American football player
- Schea Cotton (born 1978), American basketball player
- Terry Cotton (born 1946), English footballer

== Musicians ==
- Billy Cotton (1899–1969), British band leader
- Gene Cotton (born 1944), American pop and folk singer-songwriter
- James Cotton (1935–2017), American blues harmonica player, singer, songwriter
- Jeff Cotton (born 1949), American rock guitarist
- Paul Cotton (1943–2021), American guitar player

== Politicians and nobility ==
- Dorothy Cotton (1930–2018), American civil rights activist
- George W. Cotton (1821–1892), South Australian politician
- Norris Cotton (1900–1989), American politician
- Paul Cotton (diplomat) (born 1930), New Zealand diplomat
- Robert Bell Cotton (1859–1917), American politician
- The Cotton baronets
- Tom Cotton (born 1977), American politician

== Science and engineering ==
- Aimé Cotton (1869–1951), French scientist - husband of Eugénie Cotton
  - Cotton effect, named after Aimé Cotton
  - Cotton–Mouton effect, named after Aimé Cotton and Henri Mouton
- Sir Arthur Cotton (1803–1899), British general and engineer famous for his work in India
- Arthur Disbrowe Cotton (1879–1962), English plant pathologist, mycologist, phycologist, and botanist
- Bernard Charles Cotton (1905–1966), Australian malacologist
- Carl Cotton (1918–1971), American taxidermist
- Catherine Drummond Cotton (1888–1979), one of first two female geologists hired by University of Sydney as demonstrators
- Charles Cotton (geologist) (1885–1970), New Zealand geologist
- Émile Cotton (1872–1950), French mathematician, discoverer of the Cotton tensor
- Eugénie Cotton (1881–1967), French physicist, socialist, women's rights advocate, wife of Aimé Cotton
- F. Albert Cotton (1930–2007), American inorganic chemist
- Sir Robert Cotton, 1st Baronet, of Connington (1571–1631), antiquarian and bibliophile, creator of the basis of the British Library

== Television ==
- Antony Cotton (born 1975), British actor, best known for his roles in Coronation Street and Queer as Folk (UK)
- Bill Cotton (1928–2008), British television executive
- Fearne Cotton (born 1981), English television presenter and radio 1 DJ
- Mason Vale Cotton (born 2002), American actor

== Fictional ==
- Dot Cotton, a fictional character in the British soap opera EastEnders
- Kathy Beale, a fictional character in the British soap opera EastEnders

== Other ==
- Charles Cotton (1630–1687), poet
- Charles Cotton (disambiguation), several people
- David Cotton (born 1950/1951), American billionaire businessman
- Frederick Conyers Cotton (1807–1901), British Indian army officer
- John Cotton (minister) (1585–1652), clergyman, grandfather of Cotton Mather
- Mary Ann Cotton (1832–1873), British serial killer
- Richard Lynch Cotton (1794–1880), British vicar and university administrator
- Robert Cotton (disambiguation), several people
- Sarah Cotton (1815–1878), British wife of the academic and medic Sir Henry Acland, inspiration for the Acland Hospital
- Stapleton Cotton, 1st Viscount Combermere (1773–1865), British Army officer, politician and colonial administrator
- Sir Sydney Cotton (1792–1874), British Army officer.
- Thomas Cotton, several people
- William Cotton (disambiguation), several people

== See also ==
- Cotton (disambiguation)
- Cotton (nickname)
- Coton (disambiguation)
- Cotten
