= Cotten =

Cotten is a surname. Notable people with the surname include:

- Ann Cotten (born 1982), American-born Austrian writer
- Elizabeth Cotten (1893–1987), American musician and singer-songwriter
- Elizabeth Brownrigg Henderson Cotten (1875–1975), American suffragist and librarian
- Gerald Cotten (1988–2018), Canadian CEO of bankrupt cryptocurrency exchange Quadriga Fintech Solutions
- James Cotten (born 1974), American actor, film director, producer and writer
- Joanna Cotten, American country music singer
- Joni Cotten (born 1953), American curler
- Joseph Cotten (1905–1994), American actor
- Lyman A. Cotten (1874–1926), American naval officer
  - USS Cotten, warship named after him
- Mike Cotten (born 1939), American football player
- Sallie Southall Cotten (1846–1929), American writer and clubwoman
  - SS Sallie S. Cotten, Liberty ship named after her
- Sonia Cotten (born 1974), Canadian writer

== See also ==
- Cotton (surname)
