= SS Mormacpenn =

SS or MS Mormacpenn may refer to one of several Type C3 ships built for the United States Maritime Commission on behalf of Moore-McCormack Lines:

- MS Mormacpenn (1939) (MC hull number 44, Type C3), built by Sun Shipbuilding; transferred to the United States Navy as submarine tender USS Griffin (AS-13) in 1940; scrapped 1973
- SS Mormacpenn (1940) (MC hull number 66, Type C3), built by Ingalls Shipbuilding; originally laid down as Sea Swallow; transferred to the United States Navy as destroyer tender USS Markab (AD-21) in 1941; scrapped 1976
- SS Mormacpenn (1942) (MC hull number 161, Type C3-S-A1), built by Ingalls Shipbuilding; acquired by the United States Navy for conversion to Bogue-class escort carrier USS Block Island (CVE-8); transferred to the Royal Navy under Lend-Lease as HMS Hunter (D80); returned to U.S. custody in 1945 and sold for commercial service in 1947; scrapped in 1965
- SS Mormacpenn (1945) (MC hull number 2870, Type C3-S-A5), built by Ingalls Shipbuilding; delivered to Moore-McCormack in December 1946; scrapped in 1972
