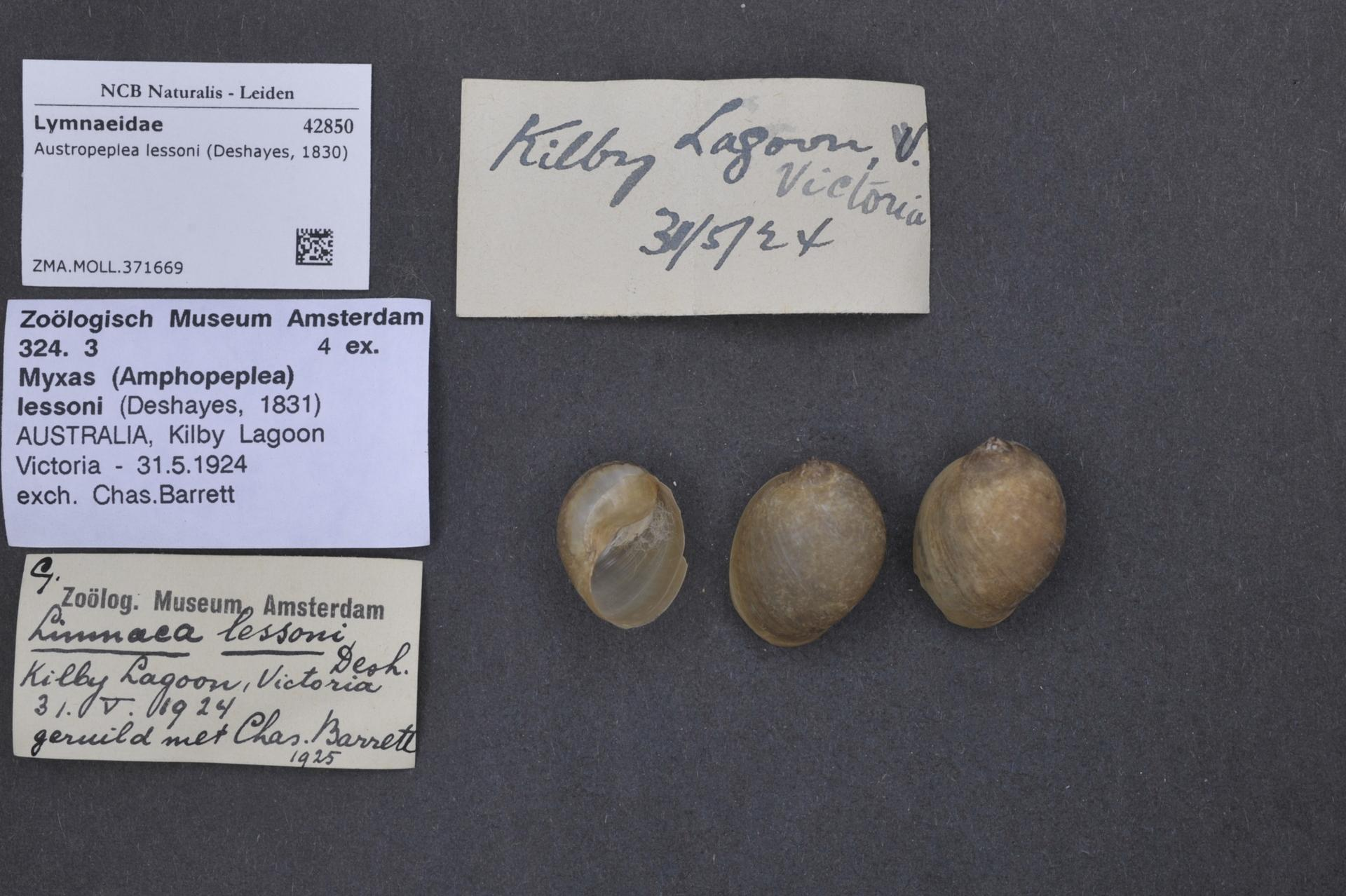
- Austropeplea lessoni shels

Scientific classification
- Kingdom: Animalia
- Phylum: Mollusca
- Class: Gastropoda
- Superorder: Hygrophila
- Family: Lymnaeidae
- Genus: Austropeplea; Cotton, 1942

Type species
- Lymnaea aruntalis Cotton & Godfrey, 1938

Synonyms
- Austropeplea (Austropeplea) Cotton, 1942; Austropeplea (Kutikina) Ponder & Waterhouse, 1997 junior subjective synonym; Glacilimnea Iredale, 1943; Kutikina Ponder & Waterhouse, 1997; Simlimnea Iredale, 1943 (junior synonym)

= Austropeplea =

Genus of gastropods

Austropeplea is a genus of air-breathing freshwater snails, aquatic pulmonate gastropod mollusks in the family Lymnaeidae, the pond snails.

== Species ==
Species within the genus Austropeplea include:

- Austropeplea brazieri (E. A. Smith, 1882)
- Austropeplea hamiltoni (Dell, 1956)
- Austropeplea hispida (Ponder & Waterhouse, 1997)
- Austropeplea huonensis (Tenison Woods, 1876)
- Austropeplea subaquatilis (Tate, 1880) - the type species of the genus Austropeplea
- Austropeplea tomentosa (L. Pfeiffer, 1855)

Synonyms=

- Austropeplea lessoni (Deshayes, 1830): synonym of Bullastra lessoni (Deshayes, 1831) (superseded combination)
- Austropeplea ollula: synonym of Orientogalba ollula (A. A. Gould, 1859)
- Austropeplea papyracea (Tate, 1880): synonym of Austropeplea subaquatilis (Tate, 1880) (unavailable name, based on a junior homonym)
- Austropeplea viridis (Quoy & Gaimard, 1832) - synonym: Lymnaea viridis: synonym of Orientogalba viridis (Quoy & Gaimard, 1832) (superseded combination)

== Distribution ==
Species in this genus occur off Australia, New Zealand and New Guinea.
