= Sir Robert Cotton, 1st Baronet =

Sir Robert Cotton, 1st Baronet may refer to:

- Sir Robert Cotton, 1st Baronet, of Connington, (1571–1631), the antiquary and MP
- Sir Robert Cotton, 1st Baronet, of Combermere (c. 1635–1712), sometime MP for Cheshire

== See also ==
- Robert Cotton (disambiguation)
