= Frank Cotton (disambiguation) =

Frank Cotton was an Australian physiologist.

Frank Cotton may also refer to:

- Frank Cotton (character)
- F. Albert Cotton (Frank Albert Cotton, 1930–2007), chemist

== See also ==
- Francis Cotton (disambiguation)
