= Coton =

Coton may refer to:

== Places ==
=== United Kingdom ===
- Coton, Cambridgeshire, a small village and civil parish
- Coton, Northamptonshire, a hamlet
  - Coton, Northamptonshire (lost settlement), within the hamlet
- Coton, Shropshire, a village
- Coton, Alveley, Shropshire
- Coton, Staffordshire, a hamlet

=== Poland ===
- Cotoń, a village

== People ==
- A. V. Coton (1906–1969), English ballet critic and writer born Edward Haddakin
- Nora Coton-Pélagie (born 1988), French footballer
- Pierre Coton (1564–1626), French Jesuit and confessor to Henry IV and Louis XIII of France
- Tony Coton (born 1961), English football coach and former footballer

== See also ==
- Coton House, a late 18th-century country house at Churchover, near Rugby, Warwickshire
- Coton Clanford, Staffordshire
- Coton Hill, Shropshire
- Coton Hill, Staffordshire
- Coton in the Elms, Derbyshire
- Coton de Tulear, a Madagascan dog
- Cotton (disambiguation)
- Cotton End (disambiguation)
