= SS Caesar Rodney =

Liberty ship of WWII

History

United States
- Name: Caesar Rodney
- Namesake: Caesar Rodney
- Owner: War Shipping Administration (WSA)
- Operator: International Freighting Corp.
- Ordered: as type (EC2-S-C1) hull, MCE hull 916
- Awarded: 1 January 1942
- Builder: Bethlehem-Fairfield Shipyard, Baltimore, Maryland
- Cost: $1,045,796
- Yard number: 2066
- Way number: 13
- Laid down: 9 August 1942
- Launched: 21 September 1942
- Sponsored by: Mrs. Frank W. Burgess
- Completed: 30 September 1942
- Identification: Call sign: KHJW
- Fate: Sold for scrapping, 24 November 1959

General characteristics
- Class & type: Liberty ship; type EC2-S-C1, standard
- Tonnage: 10,865 LT DWT; 7,176 GRT
- Displacement: 3,380 long tons (3,434 t) (light); 14,245 long tons (14,474 t) (max)
- Length: 441 feet 6 inches (135 m) oa; 416 feet (127 m) pp; 427 feet (130 m) lwl
- Beam: 57 feet (17 m)
- Draft: 27 ft 9.25 in (8.4646 m)
- Installed power: 2 × Oil fired 450 °F (232 °C) boilers, operating at 220 psi (1,500 kPa); 2,500 hp (1,900 kW)
- Propulsion: 1 × triple-expansion steam engine, (manufactured by Ellicott Machine Corp., Baltimore, Maryland); 1 × screw propeller
- Speed: 11.5 knots (21.3 km/h; 13.2 mph)
- Capacity: 562,608 cubic feet (15,931 m^{3}) (grain); 499,573 cubic feet (14,146 m^{3}) (bale)
- Complement: 38–62 USMM; 21–40 USNAG
- Armament: Varied by ship; Bow-mounted 3-inch (76 mm)/50-caliber gun; Stern-mounted 4-inch (102 mm)/50-caliber gun; 2–8 × single 20-millimeter (0.79 in) Oerlikon anti-aircraft (AA) cannons and/or, 2–8 × 37-millimeter (1.46 in) M1 AA guns

SS Caesar Rodney was a Liberty ship built in the United States during World War II. She was named after Founding Father Caesar Rodney, an American lawyer and politician from St. Jones Neck in Dover Hundred, Kent County, Delaware, east of Dover. He was an officer of the Delaware militia during the French and Indian War and the American Revolution, a Continental Congressman from Delaware, a signer of the United States Declaration of Independence, and President of Delaware during most of the American Revolution.

== Construction ==
Caesar Rodney was laid down on 9 August 1942, under a Maritime Commission (MARCOM) contract, MCE hull 916, by the Bethlehem-Fairfield Shipyard, Baltimore, Maryland; she was sponsored by Mrs. Frank W. Burgess, the wife of a yard employee, and was launched on 21 September 1942.

== History ==
She was allocated to International Freighting Corporation, on 30 September 1942. On 15 December 1948, she was laid up in the James River Reserve Fleet, Lee Hall, Virginia. On 24 November 1959, she was sold for scrapping to Walsh Construction Co., for $73,825. She was removed from the fleet on 29 January 1960.

== Bibliography ==
- "Bethlehem-Fairfield, Baltimore MD". www.ShipbuildingHistory.com. 14 August 2008.
- Maritime Administration. "Caesar Rodney". Ship History Database Vessel Status Card. U.S. Department of Transportation, Maritime Administration.
- Davies, James (May 2004). "Specifications (As-Built)" (PDF). p. 23.
- "SS Caesar Rodney".
