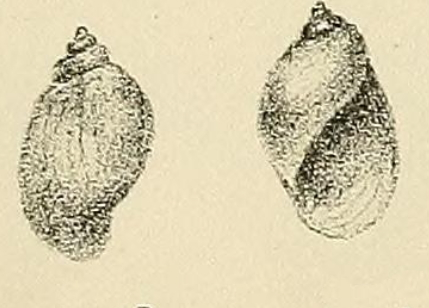
- Drawing of a shell of Austropeplea subaquatilis (holotype)

Conservation status
- Data Deficit (NZ TCS)

Scientific classification
- Kingdom: Animalia
- Phylum: Mollusca
- Class: Gastropoda
- Superorder: Hygrophila
- Family: Lymnaeidae
- Genus: Austropeplea
- Species: A. subaquatilis

Binomial name
- Austropeplea subaquatilis (Tate, 1880)

Synonyms
- Austropeplea (Austropeplea) papyracea (Tate, 1880) superseded combination; Austropeplea (Austropeplea) subaquatilis (Tate, 1880) alternative representation; Austropeplea papyracea (Tate, 1880) unavailable name (based on a junior homonym); Limnaea subaquatilis Tate, 1880 superseded combination; Limnaea viridula Tate, 1882 nomen nudum; Lymnaea aruntalis Cotton & Godfrey, 1938 junior subjective synonym; Lymnaea papyracea Tate, 1880 (a junior homonym of Limnaeus papyraceus Spix, 1827)

= Austropeplea subaquatilis =

Species of gastropod

Austropeplea subaquatilis is a species of air-breathing freshwater snail in the family Lymnaeidae.

== Description ==
The length of the shell attains 8.9 mm, its diameter 2.5 mm.

(Original description) The shell is thin and fragile, possessing a shining, horn-colored appearance. Its shape is ovate and subventricose, consisting of four whorls that are longitudinally, yet faintly, wrinkled.

The spire is short and pointed, while the suture is distinctly impressed into the surface. The aperture is large and ovate, extending to exactly half the total length of the shell. Finally, the columellar fold is thin, colored an opaque white, and is visibly reflected.

== Distribution ==
This species is endemic to Australia and occurs on South Australia and Victoria.
