= USS St. Francis =

Cargo steamship from 1914 to 1942

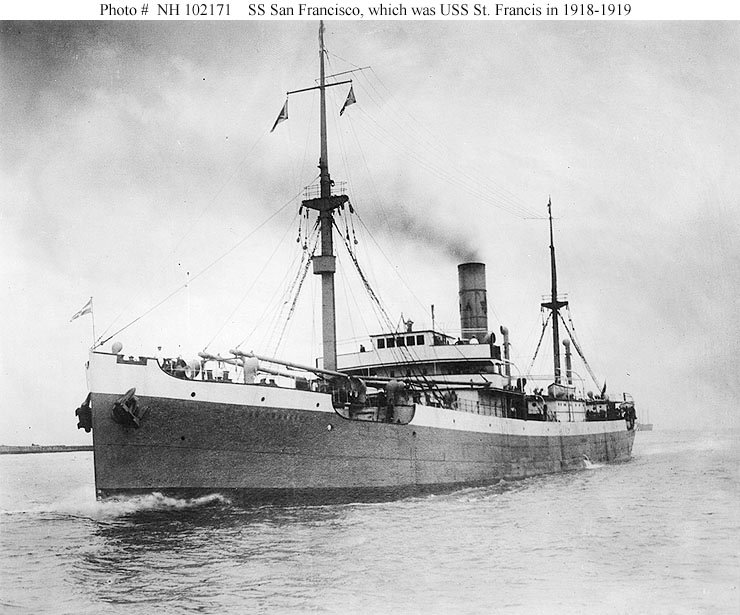
- San Francisco in 1917

History
- Name: 1914: San Francisco; 1918: St. Francis; 1919: San Francisco; 1933: Lammot du Pont
- Namesake: 1914: San Francisco; 1918: Francis of Assisi; 1933: Lammot du Pont
- Owner: 1931: Isthmian SS Co; 1914: US Steel Products Co.; 1931: Isthmian SS Co; 1933: Intl Freighting Corp
- Operator: 1918: United States Navy
- Port of registry: 1914: (United Kingdom) London; 1914: (United States) New York; 1933: (United States) Wilmington
- Builder: North of Ireland SB Co
- Yard number: 57
- Launched: 14 February 1914
- Completed: May 1914
- Identification: 1914: UK official number 136675; call sign MIB; 1914: US official number 212786; code letters LDPV; 1918: call sign KRT; pennant number ID-1557; 1934: call sign WDCY
- Fate: sunk by torpedo, 1942

General characteristics
- Type: cargo ship
- Tonnage: 5,102 GRT, 3,164 NRT
- Displacement: 11,528 tons
- Length: 405.0 ft (123.4 m)
- Beam: 52.0 ft (15.8 m)
- Draft: 25 ft 9 1/2 in (7.86 m)
- Depth: 28.1 ft (8.6 m)
- Decks: 2
- Installed power: 525 NHP
- Propulsion: triple-expansion engine
- Speed: 12 1/2 knots (23.2 km/h)
- Complement: 1918: 62
- Crew: 1942: 45 crew; + 9 armed guards
- Sensors & processing systems: by 1934: gyrocompass
- Armament: 1942: 1 × 4-inch/50-caliber gun; 2 × Browning machine guns

USS St. Francis (ID-1557) was a cargo steamship. She was built in Ireland in 1914 as San Francisco, and renamed St. Francis in 1918 when she was commissioned into the United States Navy. In 1933 she was renamed Lammot du Pont. In 1942 she was sunk by a U-boat, and 19 of her crew were lost.

== Building and registration ==
The North of Ireland Ship Building Co built San Francisco in Derry, Ireland. She was launched on 14 February 1914 and completed that May. Her registered length was 405.0 ft (123.4 m), her beam was 52.0 ft (15.8 m) and her depth was 28.1 ft (8.6 m). Her tonnages were 5,102 GRT and 3,164 NRT.

She had a single screw, driven by a three-cylinder triple-expansion steam engine built by Richardsons Westgarth & Company of Hartlepool, England. It was rated at 525 NHP or 2,250 ihp and gave her a speed of 12 1/2 knots (23.2 km/h).

San Francisco's first owner was the Isthmian Steamship Company, a British company owned by the United States Steel Products Company. At first she was registered in London. Her United Kingdom official number was 136675. From new San Francisco was equipped for wireless telegraphy. In 1914 her UK call sign was MIB.

When the First World War started at the end of July, all of Isthmian's ships were transferred to the direct ownership of the US parent company, and re-registered in New York. San Francisco's US official number was 212786 and her code letters were LDPV. By 1918 her US call sign was KRT.

== US Navy service ==
In 1918 the United States Shipping Board chartered the ship from the US Steel Products Co on behalf of the US Navy. The Navy acquired the ship at Baltimore on 19 June and commissioned her there on 25 June. The Navy already had a USS San Francisco, so the ship was commissioned as USS St.Francis. The Navy gave her the Identification Number (ID) 1557.

USS St. Francis made three voyages for the Naval Overseas Transportation Service: two to France before the Armistice of 11 November 1918 and one to Latin America afterwards. For her first voyage she loaded US Army supplies at Baltimore, sailed to New York, and there joined a convoy which left on 4 July. The convoy reached Brest, France on 19 July, from where St. Francis continued to England to discharge her cargo. (Note: Naval History and Heritage Command claims that St.Francis discharged her cargo in a place called "West Hampton, England". No such port exists.) She left England on 15 August and got back to Baltimore on 27 August.

In Baltimore St. Francis was again loaded with Army supplies. She left on 18 September, again went via New York, reached La Pallice on 13 October and continued to Saint-Nazaire, where she arrived on 14 October to discharge her cargo. From there she returned to the US, reaching Baltimore on 14 November, three days after the Armistice.

St. Francis was then transferred from an Army to a US Shipping Board Account. On 26 January 1919 she left the US for Cristóbal. She passed through the Panama Canal, and on 17 February reached Valparaíso, Chile. She returned through the canal, loaded a commercial cargo of sugar at Cienfuegos, Cuba, and on 8 April arrived in New York. The Navy decommissioned her at New York on 28 April 1919, and returned her via the US Shipping Board to her owners, who restored her name to San Francisco.

== Lammot du Pont ==
In 1933 the International Freighting Corporation, Inc. bought San Francisco, renamed her Lammot du Pont and registered her in Wilmington, Delaware. Lammot du Pont (1831–1884) was an industrial chemist and member of the du Pont family, whose DuPont company had a business relationship with the International Freighting Corp. By 1934 her navigation equipment included a gyrocompass, and her four-letter call sign was WDCY.

After the US joined the Second World War in December 1941, Lammot du Pont was defensively armed with one 4-inch/50-caliber gun and two M1919 Browning machine guns, and she carried nine US Navy armed guards to crew them.

On the evening of 23 April 1942 she was steaming unescorted at 9 1/2 knots (17.6 km/h) about 500 nautical miles (930 km) southeast of Bermuda. At 20:53 hrs U-125 attacked her, hitting her with one torpedo between her number 4 hold and engine room. Lammot du Pont rapidly listed to port, and within five minutes rolled completely on her side. She sank at position 27°10′N 57°10′W. Six members of her crew were killed, but the remainder got clear on one lifeboat and three rafts.

One of the rafts was broken and drifted away. Heavy seas prevented the other survivors from reaching it, and the two men aboard the broken raft were lost. There were eight crewmen and seven armed guards in the remaining two rafts. Two days later the Swedish motor cargo ship Astri found and rescued them. On 8 May she transferred them to the cruiser USS Omaha, which on 11 May landed them in Recife, Brazil.

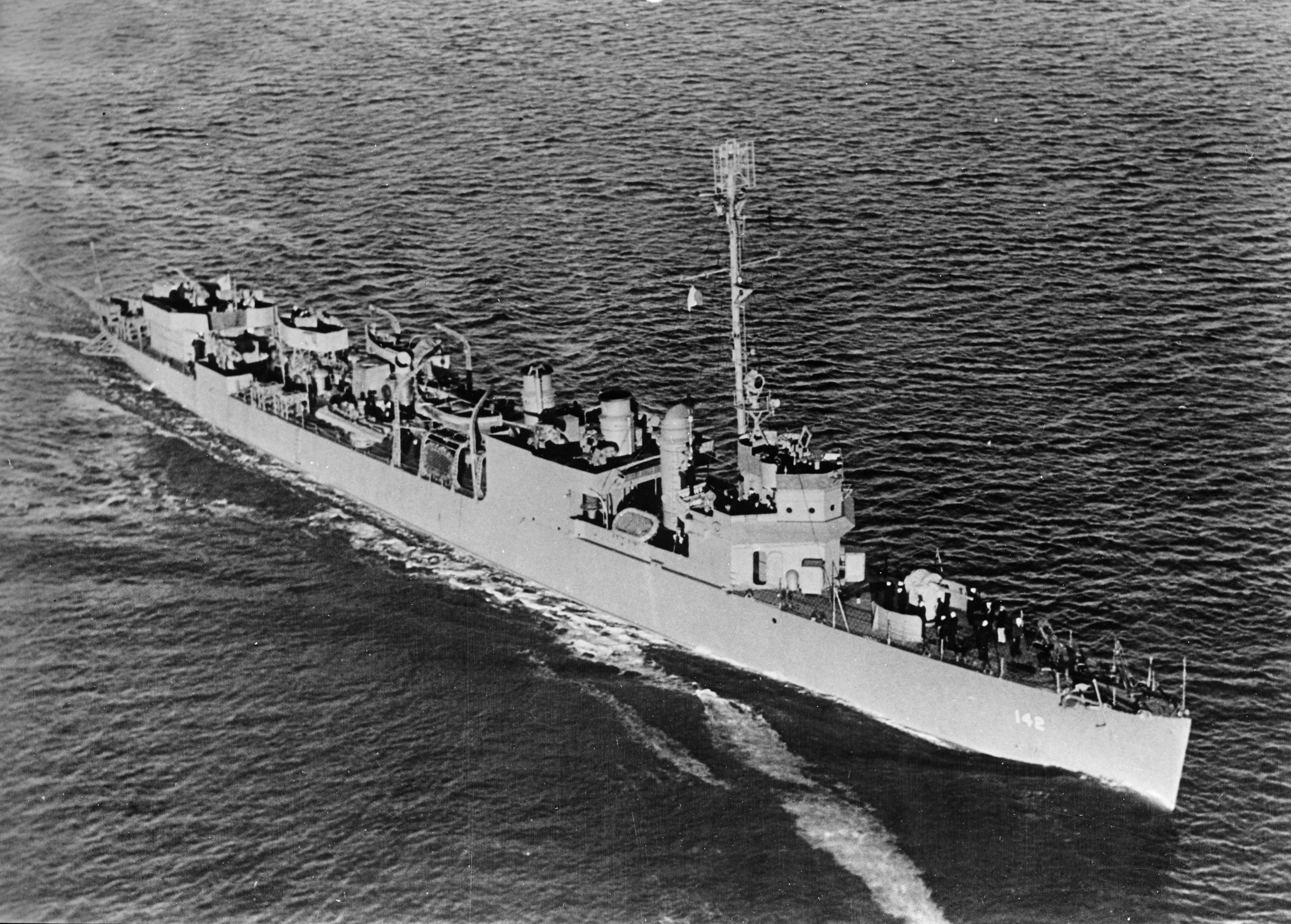
USS Tarbell rescued survivors from Lammot du Pont's lifeboat

The remaining lifeboat initially contained 31 crewmen and two armed guards. It drifted for 23 days, in which time seven crewmen and one of the guards died of fever. Then an aircraft sighted it about 40 nautical miles (74 km) from San Juan, Puerto Rico. The destroyer USS Tarbell rescued them and landed them at San Juan, where a further three crewmen died in hospital. In total 19 men died and 35 survived.

== Bibliography ==
- Lloyd's Register of Shipping. Vol. I–Steamers. London: Lloyd's Register of Shipping. 1914. – as published
- Lloyd's Register of Shipping. Vol. I–Steamers. London: Lloyd's Register of Shipping. 1914 – via Internet Archive. – as amended
- Lloyd's Register of Shipping (PDF). Vol. II–Steamers and Motorships of 300 tons gross and over. London: Lloyd's Register of Shipping. 1934 – via Southampton City Council.
- The Marconi Press Agency Ltd (1914). The Year Book of Wireless Telegraphy and Telephony. London: The Marconi Press Agency Ltd.
- The Marconi Press Agency Ltd (1918). The Year Book of Wireless Telegraphy and Telephony. London: The Wireless Press, Ltd.
