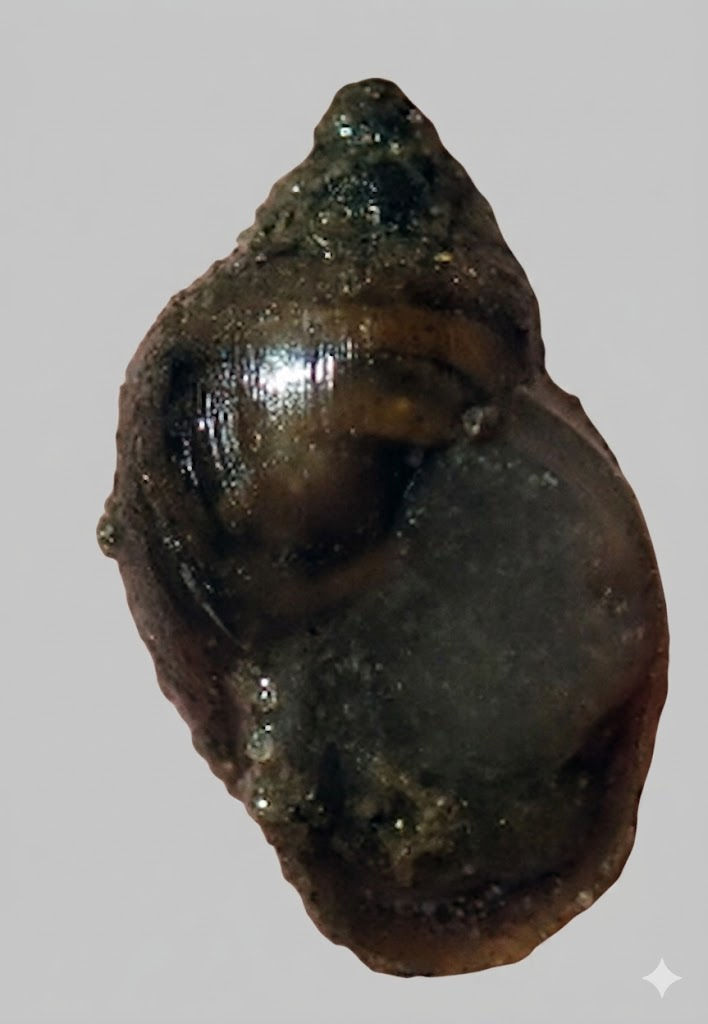
- Shell of Austropeplea brazieri

Conservation status
- Data Deficit (NZ TCS)

Scientific classification
- Kingdom: Animalia
- Phylum: Mollusca
- Class: Gastropoda
- Superorder: Hygrophila
- Family: Lymnaeidae
- Genus: Austropeplea
- Species: A. brazieri

Binomial name
- Austropeplea brazieri (E. A. Smith, 1882)

Synonyms
- Austropeplea (Austropeplea) brazieri (E. A. Smith, 1882) alternative representation; Glacilimnea gelida Iredale, 1943 junior subjective synonym; Limnaea brazieri E. A. Smith, 1882 superseded combination; Limnaea victoriae E. A. Smith, 1882 junior subjective synonym; Limnaeus brazieri E. A. Smith, 1882 superseded combination; Limnaeus victoriae E. A. Smith, 1882 junior subjective synonym; Simlimnea aegrifer Iredale, 1944 junior subjective synonym; Simlimnea morbida Iredale, 1944 junior subjective synonym

= Austropeplea brazieri =

Species of gastropod

Austropeplea brazieri is a species of air-breathing freshwater snail in the family Lymnaeidae.

== Description ==
The length of the shell attains 9 mm, its diameter 5.5 mm.

(Original description) The shell is ovate in form and tapers to an acuminate apex. It possesses a glossy finish and a brownish horn-colored hue. Its surface is somewhat strongly striated longitudinally by the lines of increment, though it is notably devoid of any spiral or transverse sculpture.

There are four whorls in total, each of which is very convex and is separated by a simple, relatively deep suture. The aperture is ovately pyriform (pear-shaped) and is quite large, occupying approximately two-thirds of the shell's entire length.

The columella is obliquely arcuate and becomes spirally contorted; it features a margin that is either flattish or even slightly excavated. This margin is reflexed in the umbilical region and is ultimately connected with the upper lip by a thin, whitish callosity.

== Distribution ==
This species is endemic to Australia and occurs in New South Wales.
