= Austropeplea hispida =

Conservation status
- Data Deficit (NZ TCS)

Scientific classification
- Kingdom: Animalia
- Phylum: Mollusca
- Class: Gastropoda
- Superorder: Hygrophila
- Family: Lymnaeidae
- Genus: Austropeplea
- Species: A. hispida

Binomial name
- Austropeplea hispida (Ponder & Waterhouse, 1997)

Synonyms
- Austropeplea (Kutikina) hispida (Ponder & Waterhouse, 1997); Kutikina hispida Ponder & Waterhouse, 1997 (original combination)

Species of gastropod

Austropeplea hispida is a species of air-breathing freshwater snail in the family Lymnaeidae.

== Distribution ==
This species is endemic to Australia and occurs on Tasmania.
