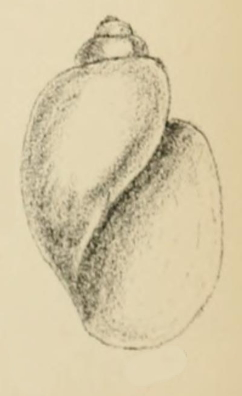
- Drawing of a shell of Austropeplea huonensis

Conservation status
- Data Deficit (NZ TCS)

Scientific classification
- Kingdom: Animalia
- Phylum: Mollusca
- Class: Gastropoda
- Superorder: Hygrophila
- Family: Lymnaeidae
- Genus: Austropeplea
- Species: A. huonensis

Binomial name
- Austropeplea huonensis (Tenison Woods, 1876)

Synonyms
- Austropeplea (Austropeplea) huonensis (Tenison Woods, 1876) alternative representation; Limnaea gunnii Petterd, 1889 junior subjective synonym; Limnaea huonensis Tenison Woods, 1876 superseded combination; Limnaea launcestonensis Tenison Woods, 1876 junior subjective synonym; Limnaea lutosa Petterd, 1889 junior subjective synonym; Limnaea subaquatilis var. neglecta Petterd, 1889 junior subjective synonym; Limnaeus huonensis Tenison Woods, 1876 superseded combination; Limnaeus launcestonensis Tenison Woods, 1876 junior subjective synonym

= Austropeplea huonensis =

Species of gastropod

Austropeplea huonensis is a species of air-breathing freshwater snail in the family Lymnaeidae.

== Description ==
The length of the shell attains 8 mm, its diameter 4.5 mm.

(Original description) The shell is remarkably thin, pellucid, and possesses a brilliant, shining luster. It is ventricose in shape and displays a pale, horny coloration. The overall profile is rather straight, leading to a spire that is notably short and acute.

There are four whorls in total, with the penultimate whorl being distinctly rounded. The body whorl is large and exhibits a concave area situated behind the columella. The aperture is ovate and somewhat produced in its form.

The outer lip is very thin and sharp, while the inner lip appears expanded. The columellar fold is twisted, and the columella itself is gracefully arched.

== Distribution ==
This species is endemic to Australia and occurs on Tasmania.
