= Thomas Cotton =

Thomas or Tom Cotton may refer to:

- Thomas Cotton (MP for Huntingdonshire) (died 1574), MP for Huntingdonshire
- Sir Thomas Cotton, 2nd Baronet, of Connington (1594–1662), English politician
- Sir Thomas Cotton, 2nd Baronet, of Combermere (c. 1672–1715), English peer
- Thomas Cotton (dissenting minister) (1653–1730), English minister
- Thomas A. Cotton, state legislator in Mississippi during the Reconstruction era
- Thomas Forrest Cotton (1884–1965), Canadian cardiologist
- Tom Cotton (born 1977), American politician
- Tom "Rocky" Cotton, fictional character in EastEnders

== See also ==
- Cotton (disambiguation)
