= Cotton End (disambiguation) =

Cotton End may refer to:

== Places ==
=== United Kingdom ===
- Cotton End in Bedfordshire - a small village in south Bedfordshire, England
- Cotton End, Northampton - a district of Northampton, England

== See also ==
- Coton (disambiguation)
