= USS Markab =

American auxiliary ship

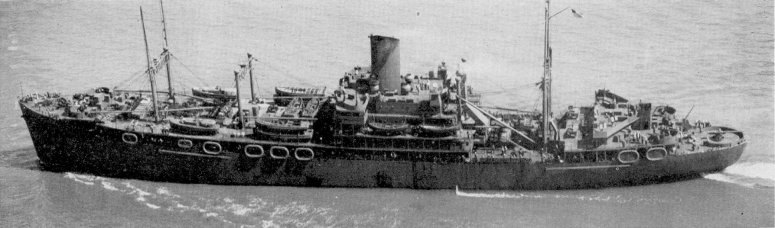
- USS Markab (AD-21) underway 7 October 1942, location unknown.

History

United States
- Name: Mormacpenn; Markab
- Builder: Ingalls Shipbuilding, Pascagoula, Mississippi
- Launched: 21 December 1940
- Acquired: 2 June 1941
- Commissioned: 15 June 1941
- Decommissioned: January 1947
- Reclassified: AK-31 (Cargo ship), 15 June 1941; AD-21 (Destroyer tender), 24 January 1942; AR-23, 15 April 1960
- Recommissioned: 26 February 1952
- Decommissioned: 31 July 1955
- Recommissioned: 1 July 1960
- Decommissioned: 19 December 1969
- Reclassified: AR-23 (Repair ship), 15 April 1960
- Stricken: 1 September 1976
- Fate: Transferred to the Maritime Administration, 12 March 1976; Sold for scrapping, 12 April 1977

General characteristics
- Class & type: Hamul-class destroyer tender
- Displacement: 8,560 long tons (8,697 t) light; 18,900 long tons (19,203 t) full
- Length: 492 ft (150 m)
- Beam: 69 ft (21 m)
- Draft: 28 ft 6 in (8.69 m)
- Propulsion: Geared turbine, 8,500 shp (6,338 kW), single propeller
- Speed: 17 knots (31 km/h; 20 mph)
- Complement: 864 officers and enlisted
- Armament: 1 × 5"/38 caliber gun; 4 × 3"/50 caliber guns; 2 × twin 40 mm gun mounts; 8 × twin 20 mm gun mounts

Service record
- Operations: World War II; Korean War; Vietnam War
- Awards: 1 battle star (Vietnam)

USS Markab (AD-21) was a Hamul-class destroyer tender named for Markab, the third-brightest star in the constellation Pegasus.

== Construction, acquisition, and commissioning ==
Markab was built as the cargo ship Mormacpenn by Ingalls Shipbuilding Company of Pascagoula, Mississippi and launched 21 December 1940. A ship named Mormacpenn launched the previous year had been acquired by the Navy to become the USS Griffin. The later Mormacpenn, sponsored at launch by the wife of the General Counsel of the Maritime Commission, Mrs. Carl F. Farbach, was intended for service on the South American routes of the American Republics Line.

The ship was acquired by the United States Navy on 2 June 1941 before any commercial service at Charleston, South Carolina; and commissioned as USS Markab (AK 31) on 15 June 1941.

== Service history ==
=== World War II ===
==== Cargo ship, 1941–1942 ====
Markab operated with Atlantic amphibious forces in the Hampton Roads area until 1 October 1941. She then loaded cargo at Jersey City, New Jersey for delivery to American troops recently stationed in Greenland. Returning to Brooklyn, New York on 21 November, she took on board supplies for distribution to various bases in the Caribbean. World War II engulfed the United States before Markab steamed into Ensenada Honda, Puerto Rico, her first port of call. The new wartime demands on the Navy caused this voyage to terminate at Mobile, Alabama on 8 January 1942 where she was converted to a destroyer tender. Sixteen days later she was redesignated AD-21.

==== Destroyer tender, 1942–1947 ====
After shakedown Markab transited the Panama Canal on 27 October to join Destroyer Force, Pacific Fleet at Pearl Harbor. Ships recently returned from the battle for the Solomon Islands made use of her facilities for three months prior to her departure on 6 February 1943 to service the North Pacific Force. In the year she remained in the Aleutians, she rendered noteworthy service in helping to prepare vessels for both the Attu and Kiska invasions. Steaming to San Francisco late in January, 1944 the ship prepared for an even more extensive Pacific tour.

She departed the West Coast on 26 February and worked her way toward the war zone. As a part of Service Squadron 10, Markab overhauled, repaired, and replenished destroyers and destroyer escorts at Pearl Harbor, Majuro, and Eniwetok in the Marshall Islands, and Ulithi in the Carolines. Having assisted in preparing and sustaining the ships fighting in the bloody conquests of the Marianas and Iwo Jima, she sailed for the Philippines on 16 February 1945. Her work force now overhauled and readied landing craft for the assault on Okinawa. During June she played an important part in preparing TF 38 for the last great raids on Japan.

Following the Japanese surrender, Markab refitted and restocked ships bound for the occupation areas of Japan, Korea, and China. Steaming in their wake, she arrived Sasebo, Japan on 1 November and early in January 1946 joined the 7th Fleet at Shanghai, China. Her services in the western Pacific ended 2 April as Markab commenced the long voyage home for inactivation. The ship off loaded at New Orleans beginning 6 May. At Orange, Texas in January 1947 she decommissioned and entered the Atlantic Reserve Fleet.

=== Korea, 1952–1955 ===
When the Cold War turned hot in Korea, the resultant expansion of the Navy brought the temporary reactivation of Markab. Recommissioned on 26 February 1952 she remained on the East Coast servicing Destroyer Force ships. Operating initially at Newport, Rhode Island and after April, 1955 at Fall River, Massachusetts, Markab also participated in the semiannual fleet exercises. On 9 February she departed on a voyage to Charleston where she decommissioned on 31 July.

=== Vietnam, 1960–1969 ===
Towed to Mare Island Navy Yard in California, she was redesignated as Repair Ship AR-23 on 15 April 1960 and recommissioned on 1 July. Homeported at Alameda Naval Air Station, the repair ship sailed to Pearl Harbor late in October, returning 22 December. Between 5 July 1962 and 14 September 1966 she projected her services even more widely, steaming three times on seven month WestPac deployments. On the first such voyage Markab returned a priceless Chinese art treasures exhibit to Taiwan. On the next two tours, ships returning from combat patrol off the coast of Vietnam increasingly required her facilities. Interspersed with the work periods in the Philippines and Japan were brief rest and rehabilitation periods at Hong Kong and Buckner Bay, Okinawa. She continued this pattern of West Coast duty and western Pacific deployment into 1969. Markab earned one campaign star for Vietnam War service.

== Decommissioning and scrapping ==
Decommissioned again on 19 December 1969 at the Naval Inactive Ship Maintenance Facility in Vallejo, California, Markab was struck from the Naval Vessel Register on 1 September 1976. Custody was permanently transferred to the Maritime Administration and the ship was placed in the Suisun Bay Reserve Fleet on 3 December 1976. The ship was sold to Zidell Explorations, Inc., 12 April 1977 for $301,688.88, and physically delivered to zidell on 3 May 1977 for scrapping.
