= Robert Cotton =

Robert Cotton may refer to:

- Robert Cotton (MP, died 1559), MP for Leicester
- Sir Robert Cotton, 1st Baronet, of Connington (1571–1631), English antiquary and creator of the Cotton Library
- Sir Robert Cotton, 1st Baronet, of Combermere (c. 1635–1712), MP for Cheshire
- Robert Cotton (MP, born 1644) (1644–1717), English politician
- Sir Robert Cotton, 5th Baronet, of Connington (c. 1669–1749) of the Cotton baronets
- Sir Robert Cotton, 3rd Baronet, of Combermere (1695–1748), MP for Cheshire and Lostwithiel
- Sir Robert Salusbury Cotton, 5th Baronet, of Combermere (c. 1739–1809), MP for Cheshire
- Robert Cotton (cricketer) (1909–1979), English cricketer
- Robert Bell Cotton (1859–1917), member of the Mississippi House of Representatives
- Sir Bob Cotton (1915–2006), Australian Federal Senator
- Bob Cotton (basketball) (1920–1999), American basketball player

== See also ==
- Cotton (disambiguation)
