= Francis Cotton =

Francis Cotton may refer to:

- Francis Cotton (politician) (1857–1942), Australian politician
- Francis Ridgley Cotton (1895–1960), American bishop
- Fran Cotton (Francis Edward Cotton, born 1947), English rugby union prop forward

== See also ==
- Francis Lovett Carter-Cotton (1843–1919), Canadian politician
- Frank Cotton (disambiguation)
- William Francis Cotton (1847–1917), Irish politician
