= Sidney Cotton =

Australian inventor and aviator (1894–1969)

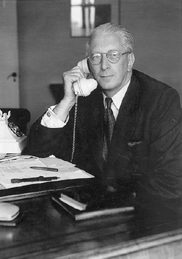
- Frederick Sidney Cotton c. 1941
- Born: 17 June 1894; Goorganga, near Proserpine, Queensland, Australia
- Died: 13 February 1969 (aged 74); Uckfield, Sussex, England
- Military career
- Allegiance: Australia
- Branch: Royal Air Force
- Service years: 1915–1917; 1939–1940
- Rank: Squadron leader
- Unit: P.D.U. (Photographic Development Unit) Royal Air Force
- Commands: P.D.U. (Photographic Development Unit) Royal Air Force
- Conflicts: First World War; Second World War
- Awards: Officer of the Order of the British Empire

Frederick Sidney Cotton OBE (17 June 1894 – 13 February 1969) was an Australian inventor, photographer and aviation and photography pioneer, responsible for developing and promoting an early colour film process, and largely responsible for the development of photographic reconnaissance before and during World War II. He numbered among his close friends George Eastman, Ian Fleming and Winston Churchill.

== Early years ==
Frederick Sidney Cotton was born on 17 June 1894 on a cattle station at Goorganga, near Proserpine, Queensland. He was the third child of Alfred and Annie Cotton, who were involved in pastoralism. Cotton was educated at Toowoomba Grammar School and The Southport School in Queensland. In 1910, he and his family went to England, where he attended Cheltenham College; however the family returned to Australia in 1912. Cotton worked as a jackeroo, training to work with livestock at stations in New South Wales up until the outbreak of war.

== First World War ==
On 4 August 1914, Britain declared war on Germany because of the German violation of Belgian neutrality, which the United Kingdom had guaranteed in 1839. Australia, as part of the British Empire, was automatically also at war. Cotton had wanted to join the Australian Imperial Force, which had been raised to assist with the war effort, but Cotton's father forbade this. In April 1915, Cotton read a newspaper account of the sinking of the British ocean liner Lusitania by a U-boat; this so incensed him that he decided to enlist despite his parents' objections. Cotton booked a passage to England on board the ocean liner Maloja, the majority of whose passengers were young Australians like himself determined to "do their bit" for king and country.

Cotton went to England to join the Royal Naval Air Service in November 1915. After only five hours solo flying he qualified as a combat pilot, and initially flew Channel patrols. Cotton went on to participate in night bombing sorties over France and Germany with Nos 3 and 5 Wings. Cotton was first based with Number 5 wing in Coudekerque where he undertook bombing raids over the German lines. He was then assigned to the Number 5 wing based in Luxeuil where he undertook bombing raids over southern Germany.

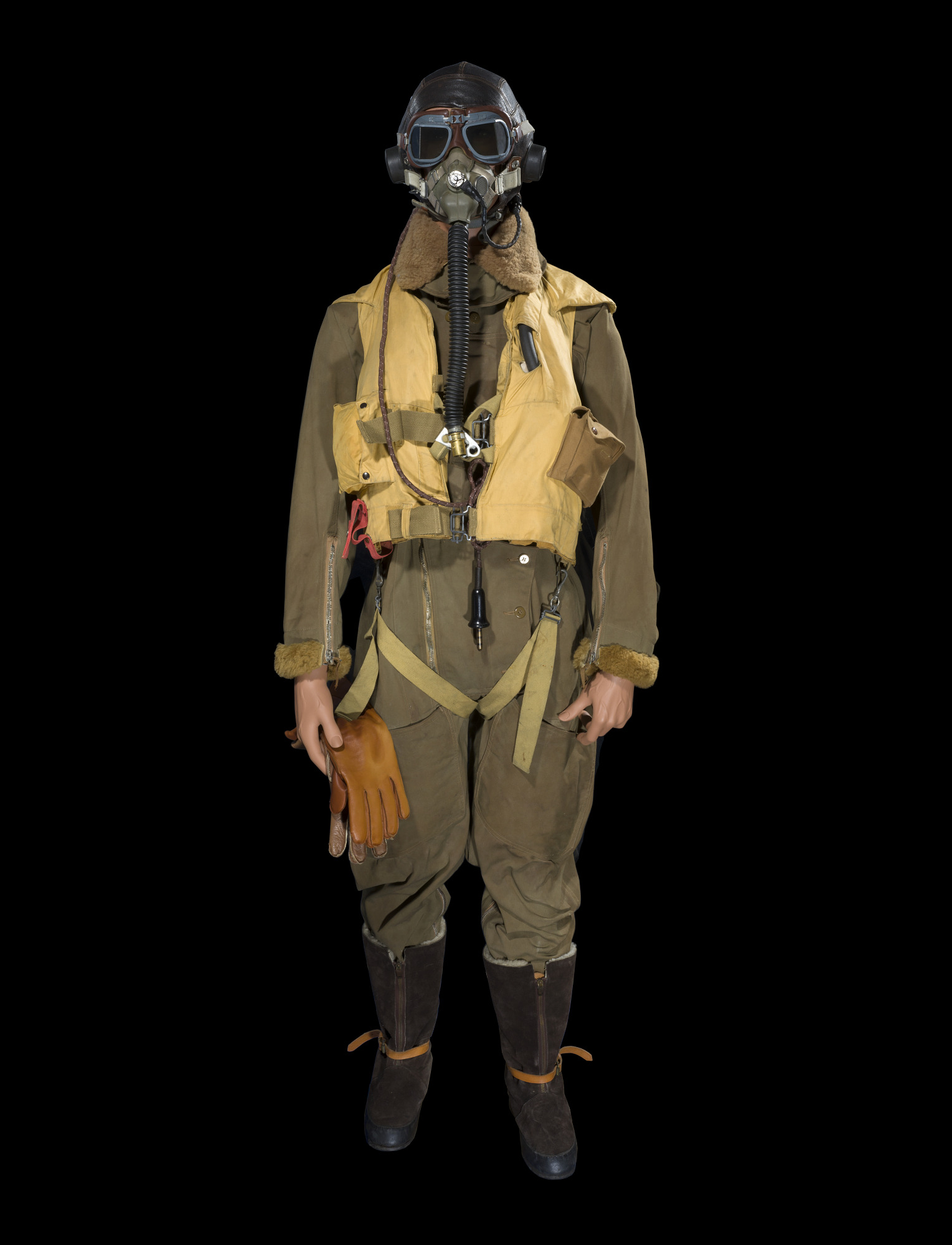
A 1940-pattern RAF "Sidcot" flying suit, National Air and Space Museum

His experience with high level and low-temperature flying led Cotton in 1917 to develop the 'Sidcot' suit, a flying suit which solved the problem pilots had of keeping warm in the cockpit. (Note: The 'Sidcot' suit is sometimes known as the 'SidCot suit'.) This flying suit was widely used by the Royal Air Force until the 1950s. Cotton continued with No. 8 Squadron RNAS in 1917 where he was promoted to Flight Sub-Lieutenant in June 1917. In July 1917, he flew a Handley Page bomber on a raid on Constantinople. Soon after, he came into conflict with senior officers, and resigned his commission in October 1917. On 16 October 1917, he married a 17-year old actress, Regmor Agnes Joan Morvaren Maclean, in London. Cotton had a son by his first wife.

== Between the wars ==
After the war he spent time in Tasmania where he worked as the manager of an apple-drying factory owned by his father, and then returned to England, where he continued his passion for flying. In 1920, he embarked on an unsuccessful attempt to fly from England to South Africa, and also made a lucky escape from a crash at the Aerial Derby. Cotton then spent three years working in Newfoundland flying various assignments.

Following the divorce from his first wife the previous year, in 1926, Cotton married 18-year-old Millicent Joan Henry whom he had met in Newfoundland. From this time up until the outbreak of the Second World War, Cotton led a colourful and eventful life; he took part in various business activities, including an airborne seal-spotting service as well as aerial search and rescue operations for lost explorers in Newfoundland and Greenland. Cotton was for much of the 1920s based in St. John's, the capital of the Dominion of Newfoundland, where he was employed by sealer firms to work as an aircraft spotter to find sealers out in the ice fields of the Arctic Ocean. In 1927, when two French airmen, Charles Nungesser and François Coli, vanished in an attempt to cross the Atlantic non-stop, Cotton was hired by the wealthy Du Pont family to try to find the two missing airmen. In 1931, Cotton found and rescued the British Arctic explorer Augustine Courtauld who had been trapped in an ice field in Greenland. At a time when most photographs were in black and white, Cotton purchased the rights to sell outside of France a French colour film called Dufaycolor, which led him to engage in frequent travels.

== Spy missions ==
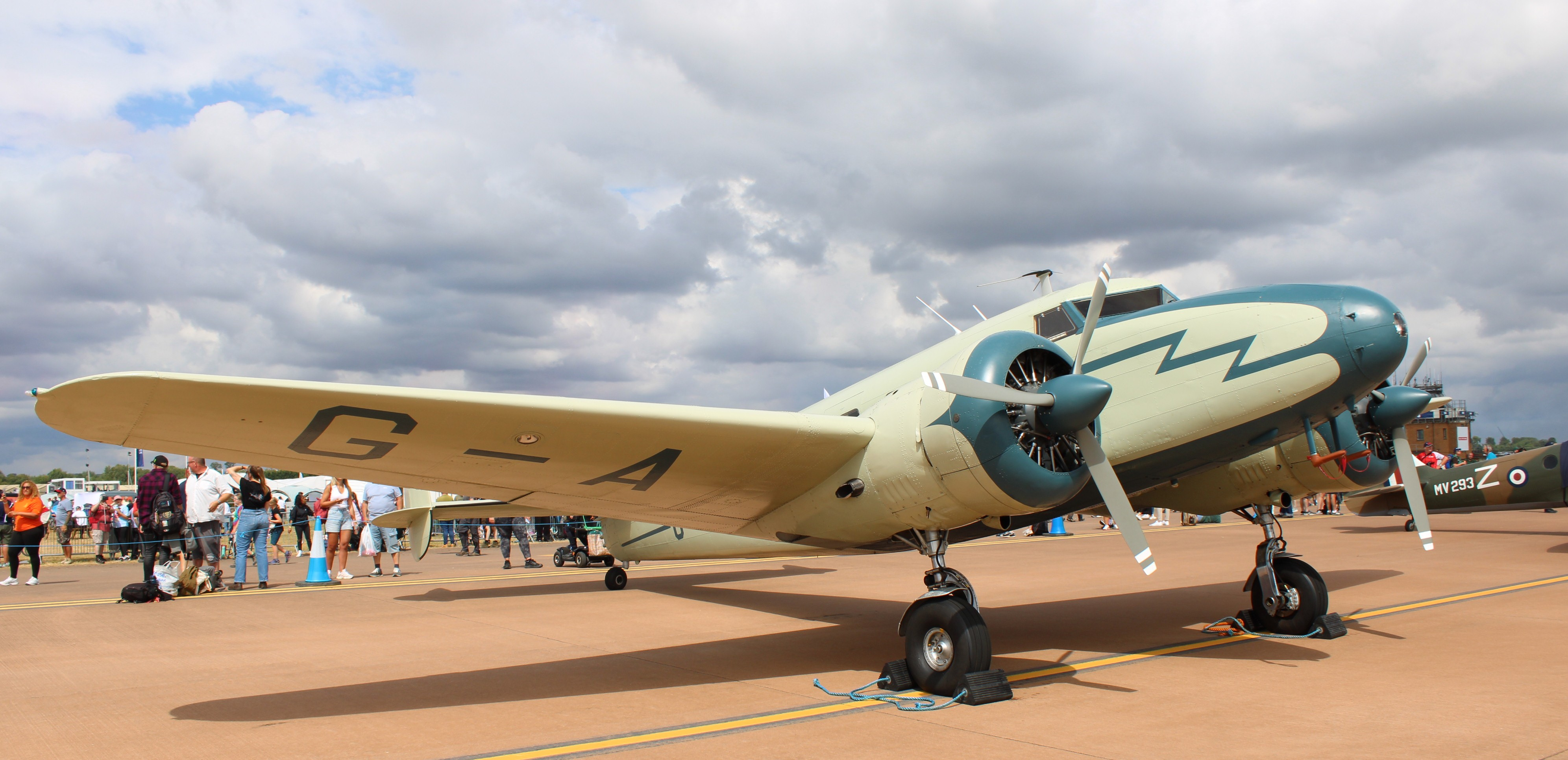
G-AFEL, the Lockheed 12A Electra used by Cotton for his espionage flights, photographed in 2025

In September 1938 during the Sudetenland crisis, Cotton was approached by agents of the Deuxième Bureau (the French intelligence department) to undertake spy flights over Germany. Cotton's role in promoting Dufaycolor led him to travel all over the world, which gave him a plausible excuse to fly to Germany. Starting on 25 March 1939, using the cover of a newly founded dummy corporation, the Aeronautical Research and Sales Corporation of London, Cotton started to make spy flights over Germany, Italy and the Italian colony of Libya in the pay of the Deuxième Bureau.

In April 1939, Cotton was recruited by Fred Winterbotham of MI6 to take clandestine aerial photographs of the German military buildup. Cotton's mission was the same as before, using flights for the Aeronautical Research and Sales Corporation as a cover for espionage with the only difference being that his paymasters were MI6 instead of the Deuxième Bureau. Cotton turned over his Lockheed Electra airplane to the Deuxième Bureau while MI6 provided Cotton with a new Lockheed 12-A Electra aircraft. Cotton's co-pilot on his spy flights was R.H. Niven, a Canadian serving in the Royal Air Force. Using his status as a wealthy and prominent private aviator currently promoting his film business (and using a series of other subterfuges including taking on the guise of an archaeologist or a film producer looking for locations), a series of flights provided valuable information about German naval activity and troop buildups. He equipped the civilian Lockheed 12A business aircraft, G-AFTL, with three F24 cameras concealed behind panels which could be slid aside and operated by pressing a button under the pilot's seat, and a Leica behind a similar panel in the wings. The camera ports were covered while the G-AFTL was on the ground. The G-AFTL was provided with additional fuel tanks to increase its flying range from the normal 700 miles to 1, 600 miles. Warm cabin air was diverted to prevent condensation on optical surfaces. Cotton took his secretary/mistress Patricia Martin along, and she too took photographs in flight. Although his flight plans were dictated by the German government, he consistently managed to get away with flying off-track over military installations. Cotton had a very persuasive manner, and exploited any advantage he could.

In 1939, Cotton took aerial photos during a flight over parts of the Middle East and North Africa. On the eve of war, he even managed to engineer a joy-ride over German military airfields on one occasion, accompanied by senior Luftwaffe officer Albert Kesselring. With Kesselring at the controls, Cotton reached under his seat, operated the cameras, and captured the airfield on film.

Cotton later offered to fly Hermann Göring to London for talks a week before outbreak of hostilities. Göring was widely viewed before the war as the principal moderate Nazi leader who was a restraining force on Adolf Hitler. During the Danzig crisis, the Germans engaged in an elaborate charade designed to split Britain from Poland. Göring presented himself to the British ambassador Sir Nevile Henderson (who considered Göring to be his best friend) as a moderate, the voice of reason and restraint who was engaged in a power struggle against the extremist Foreign Minister Joachim von Ribbentrop, who was well known for his ultra-aggressive belligerent views. Crucially, the fact that Hitler had firmly decided on 27 March 1939 to invade Poland later that year was never mentioned, and instead Hitler was misrepresented as merely considering war against Poland if Danzig was not permitted to rejoin Germany. That Hitler had given orders on 27 March to have Fall Weiss (Case White), the codename for the invasion of Poland, launched on 26 August 1939 (later pushed back to 1 September) was a very closely guarded secret that only a few people were aware of, and most people during the Danzig crisis believed that Hitler was only considering invading Poland if Danzig was not allowed to rejoin Germany. Göring argued to Henderson and other British officials that to win his supposed power struggle against Ribbentrop to stop the Danzig crisis from turning into a war that he needed Poland to make concessions on the Danzig question. The purpose of the charade was to persuade the British government that there was still time to save the peace by pressuring Poland to make concessions, and that when the Poles as expected rejected the British advice to allow the Free City of Danzig to "go home to the Reich" that the British would renounce the guarantee of Poland, thereby allowing Germany to invade Poland without fear of a war with Britain. Like many others, Cotton was fooled by the charade and on 22 August 1939 offered to fly Göring to London in secret to meet the British Prime Minister Neville Chamberlain as Cotton believed that it was still possible to stop the crisis from turning into a war. Cotton believed if only Chamberlain and Göring could meet in secret that it was possible to work out a peaceful solution to the crisis and avoid a war where millions would die. Göring, knowing that to fly to London would ultimately expose the charade expressed his approval of Cotton's plan and then found various excuses not to go to London. Cotton's flight was the last civilian aircraft to leave Berlin before the outbreak of hostilities. After Cotton took off from the airport in Berlin, he noticed Luftwaffe planes on their way to bomb Poland. Upon landing in Britain, he told British customs that he just left Berlin earlier that morning and was told: "Left it a bit late, haven't you?" One biography is titled Sidney Cotton: The Last Plane Out of Berlin commemorating this escapade.

== Second World War ==
Commissioned in the RAF as a substantive squadron leader and acting wing commander on 22 September 1939, in the same period, Cotton was recruited to head up the fledgling Photo Photographic Development Unit (PDU) at Heston Aerodrome. This unit provided important intelligence leading to successful air raids on key enemy installations. With his experience and knowledge gained over Germany and other overflights, Cotton greatly improved the RAF's photo reconnaissance capabilities. The PDU was originally equipped with Bristol Blenheims, but Cotton considered these quite unsuitable, being far too slow, and he consequently wheedled a couple of Supermarine Spitfires. These Spitfires, later augmented by de Havilland Mosquitos, were steadily adapted to fly higher and faster, with a highly polished surface, a special blue – 'PRU Blue' – camouflage scheme developed by Cotton himself, and a series of modifications to the engines to produce more power at high altitudes. In 1940, Cotton also personally made another important reconnaissance flight with his Lockheed 12A over Soviet Azerbaijan via Iraq as part of the preparations for Operation Pike.

Under his leadership, the 1 PDU acquired the nicknames, "Cotton's Club" or the less flattering "Cotton's Crooks" (mainly due to Cotton's propensity to flout regulations). Cotton revelled in his reputation as unorthodox, and even had a special badge struck bearing the initials CC-11 that signified the 11th commandment – "Thou shalt not be found out." At the request of Naval Intelligence, Cotton photographed the German fleet at anchor at its base in Wilhelmshaven, which led him to meet Ian Fleming.

Cotton's aerial photographs were far ahead of their time. Together with other members of the 1 PDU, he pioneered the techniques of high-altitude, high-speed stereoscopic photography that were instrumental in revealing the locations of many crucial military and intelligence targets. R.V. Jones recounts in his memoirs how these photographs were used to establish the size and the characteristic launching mechanisms for both the V-1 flying bomb and the V-2 rocket. In December 1943, using the photographs, Constance Babington Smith was the first person to identify a V-1 in an image of a test station in Peenemunde, Germany. Cotton also worked on ideas such as a prototype specialist reconnaissance aircraft and further refinements of photographic equipment.

By mid-1940 however, Cotton had clashed with senior officials in the Air Ministry over his participation in the evacuation of British agents from France under the cover name of Special Survey Flights. With the Fall of France, Cotton returned from France, couriering for a fee Marcel Boussac, the head of the Christian Dior garment and perfume empire. He was removed from his post and banned from any involvement with air operations. Following several efforts to be reinstated, even involving Churchill himself, Cotton resigned his commission; he was nevertheless appointed an OBE. For the remainder of the war, Cotton acted as an unofficial consultant to the Admiralty. Under the new designation, 1 Photographic Reconnaissance Unit (PRU), based at RAF Benson, 1 PRU went on to a distinguished wartime record, eventually operating five squadrons out of a number of bases. Succeeding commanding officers would emulate the spirit and innovative techniques pioneered by Cotton.

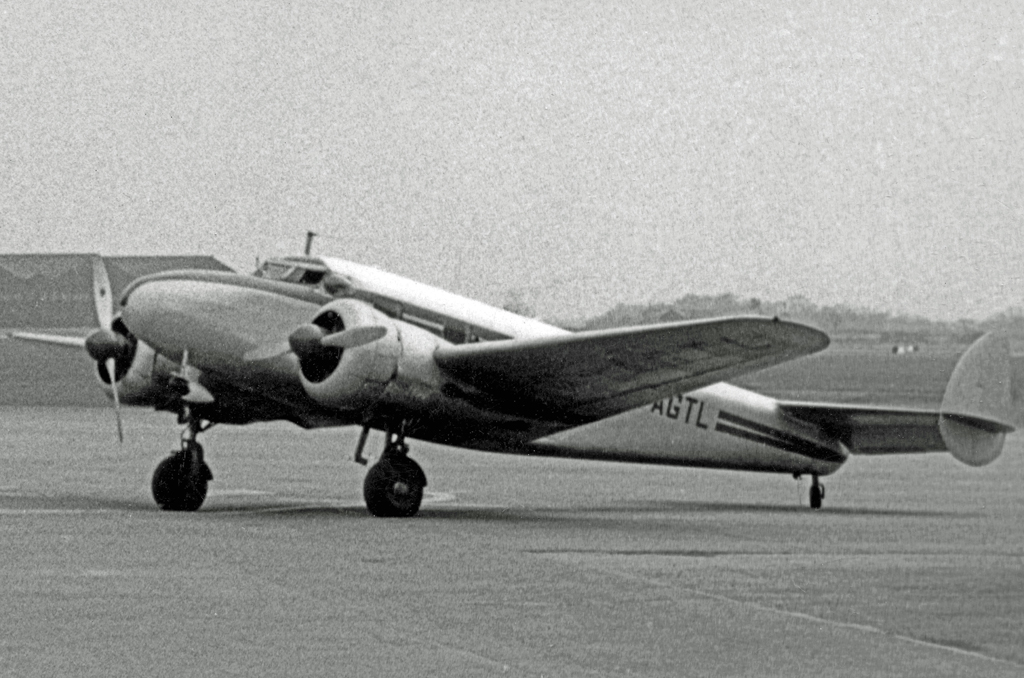
Sidney Cotton's postwar Lockheed 12A

In September 1940, Cotton's modified Lockheed 12A (G-AFTL), was severely damaged in an air raid at Heston Aerodrome. It was rebuilt by Lockheed, sold in British Honduras, and in 1948 registered in the US as N12EJ; the aircraft resided in Florida in 1992. His postwar Lockheed 12A (G-AGTL) also survives in France in 2005.

In September 1940, Cotton pursued the idea of an airborne searchlight for night-fighters, that he termed 'Aerial Target Illumination' (ATI). He enlisted the help of William Helmore, and they jointly took out patents on the techniques (GB574970 and GB575093). Helmore, a serving RAF officer, then sponsored the development of what became known as Turbinlite.

== Post-World War II ==
Like many such larger-than-life wartime figures, Cotton did not thrive in post-war civilian life. He was reluctant to profit from his wartime innovations and even waived his patent rights on the Sidcot suit. While he was sometimes very rich in later life, Cotton was also dogged by bad luck in private business.

Around the time of the Partition of India in 1947, Cotton was hired by the independent princely state of Hyderabad to assist it in resisting integration into the Dominion of India. At the request of Prince Mohammed Bakhtawar Khan and his son Prince Mumtaz Ali Khan – representatives of Osman Ali Khan (Nizam of Hyderabad) – Cotton transported gold reserves for the Dominion of Pakistan, which was an ally of the Nizam. During the first India-Pakistan War, Cotton undertook airlifts of weapons, supplies and medicines from Hyderabad to Pakistan, using unarmed Avro Lancastrian transport aircraft. Hyderabadi forces were defeated in September 1948 and the Nizam surrendered. Cotton later faced charges of gun running under the UK Air Navigation Act, was convicted and fined £200.

Thelma 'Bunty' Brooke-Smith, a former secretary, married Cotton in 1951, becoming his third wife. With Bunty, Cotton was to have another son and daughter. There were erroneous reports of Cotton's death in 1955, following an article in Flight magazine. A subsequent issue reported: "MR. F. SIDNEY COTTON has goodhumouredly [sic] characterised as 'greatly exaggerated' the report of his death, quoted in our issue of 9 September from Australian sources. Apparently there was confusion with the name of a relative [viz. Frank Cotton] who was concerned with the design of aircrew pressure suits. Mr. Sidney Cotton, whose name is associated with the Sidcot flying suit, is in this country, and very much alive." Cotton later worked in oil exploration and civil engineering.

During the late 1960s, he collaborated with a biographer, Ralph Barker, on a book entitled Aviator Extraordinary: the Sidney Cotton story. Cotton was living at Ford Manor, Lingfield when he died on 13 February 1969 aged 74. He was cremated following a service at Dormansland Parish Church on 17 February. Cotton served at least partly as the basis for the James Bond character created by his friend Ian Fleming, most notably in his womanising and a general disdain for authority. In his obituary in 1969, The Times of London declared that Cotton had established "a record of ruggedly individualistic, superbly unconventional behavior, second only to his reputation for courage and resourcefulness". In 1993, the Australian historian John McCarthy wrote: "Cotton had been an unconventional individualist who was often right when well-placed opponents were wrong. Somewhat arrogant and conceited, he made powerful enemies easily, which cost him recognition and financial rewards. Yet, he was a man of considerable courage and energy, with a sharp mind and a flair for improvisation. In another age he would have made a splendid buccaneer." Cotton was later memorialised in the name of the Sidney Cotton Bridge, on the O'Connell River, south of Proserpine, Queensland.

== See also ==
- Frank Cotton
