= SS Sarah J. Hale =

World War II Liberty ship of the United States

History

United States
- Name: Sarah J. Hale
- Namesake: Sarah J. Hale
- Owner: War Shipping Administration (WSA)
- Operator: International Freighting Corporation
- Ordered: as type (Z-EC2-S-C2) hull, MC hull 1538
- Builder: J.A. Jones Construction, Panama City, Florida
- Cost: $1,556,155
- Yard number: 20
- Way number: 6
- Laid down: 29 September 1943
- Launched: 24 November 1943
- Completed: 31 December 1943
- Identification: Call Signal: KVCF
- Fate: Laid up in National Defense Reserve Fleet, James River Group, Lee Hall, Virginia, 1 October 1945; Sold for scrapping, 31 Jul 1972

General characteristics
- Class & type: type Z-EC2-S-C2, army tank transport
- Tonnage: 10,865 LT DWT; 7,176 GRT
- Displacement: 3,380 long tons (3,434 t) (light); 14,245 long tons (14,474 t) (max)
- Length: 441 feet 6 inches (135 m) oa; 416 feet (127 m) pp; 427 feet (130 m) lwl
- Beam: 57 feet (17 m)
- Draft: 27 ft 9.25 in (8.4646 m)
- Installed power: 2 × Oil fired 450 °F (232 °C) boilers, operating at 220 psi (1,500 kPa); 2,500 hp (1,900 kW)
- Propulsion: 1 × triple-expansion steam engine, (manufactured by General Machinery Corp., Hamilton, Ohio); 1 × screw propeller
- Speed: 11.5 knots (21.3 km/h; 13.2 mph)
- Capacity: 562,608 cubic feet (15,931 m^{3}) (grain); 499,573 cubic feet (14,146 m^{3}) (bale)
- Complement: 38–62 USMM; 21–40 USNAG
- Armament: Varied by ship; Bow-mounted 3-inch (76 mm)/50-caliber gun; Stern-mounted 4-inch (102 mm)/50-caliber gun; 2–8 × single 20-millimeter (0.79 in) Oerlikon anti-aircraft (AA) cannons and/or, 2–8 × 37-millimeter (1.46 in) M1 AA guns

SS Sarah J. Hale was a Liberty ship built in the United States during World War II. She was named after Sarah J. Hale, the author of the nursery rhyme "Mary Had a Little Lamb", she campaigned for the creation of the American holiday known as Thanksgiving and for the completion of the Bunker Hill Monument, editor of Ladies' Magazine, and founder of the Seaman's Aid Society in 1833, to assist the surviving families of Boston sailors who died at sea.

== Construction ==
Sarah J. Hale was laid down on 29 September 1943, under a Maritime Commission (MARCOM) contract, MC hull 1538, by J.A. Jones Construction, Panama City, Florida; she was launched on 24 November 1943.

== History ==
She was allocated to International Freighting Corporation, on 31 December 1943. She was one of eight special ships, a Z-EC2-S-C2, a Tank carrier. She was built with larger cargo hold hatches and stronger crane lifts. J.A.Jones Construction built the eight Z-EC2-S-C2 Tank carrier in 1943. On 1 October 1945, she was laid up in the National Defense Reserve Fleet, in the James River Group, Lee Hall, Virginia. On 31 July 1972, she was sold for $77,100 to N.V. Intershitra, Rotterdam, for scrapping. She was removed from the fleet on 25 August 1972.

== Bibliography ==
- "Jones Construction, Panama City FL". www.ShipbuildingHistory.com. 13 October 2010.
- "Liberty Ships – World War II".
- Maritime Administration. "Sarah J. Hale". Ship History Database Vessel Status Card. U.S. Department of Transportation, Maritime Administration. Archived from the original on 12 December 2019.
- Davies, James (May 2004). "Specifications (As-Built)" (PDF). p. 23.
- "SS Sarah J. Hale".
