= SS Equipoise =

Panamanian cargo ship

History
- Name: (United Kingdom) Chanda (1906-1925); (Kingdom of Italy) Pietro Campanella (1925-1941); (Panama) Equipoise (1941-1942)
- Owner: International Freighting Corporation
- Builder: Barclay, Curle & Co. Ltd.
- Yard number: 457
- Launched: 27 December 1905
- Completed: 16 March 1906
- Identification: HPXO; Official number: 121308
- Fate: Torpedoed and sunk 27 March 1942

General characteristics
- Type: Cargo ship
- Tonnage: 6,210 GRT
- Length: 131.1 metres (430 ft 1 in)
- Beam: 16.6 metres (54 ft 6 in)
- Depth: 9.8 metres (32 ft 2 in)
- Installed power: 1 x 3 cyl. Triple expansion steam engine
- Propulsion: Screw propeller
- Speed: 12 knots
- Crew: 54
- Armament: 1 x 4 inch deck gun; 4 machine guns (2 x bridge, 2 x stern)

SS Equipoise was a Panamanian cargo ship that was torpedoed by the German submarine U-160 in the Atlantic Ocean 60 nautical miles (110 km) south east of Cape Henry, Virginia, United States, on 27 March 1942.

== Construction ==
Equipoise was launched on 27 December 1905 and completed on 16 March 1906 at the Barclay, Curle & Co. Ltd. shipyard in Glasgow, Scotland, United Kingdom. The ship was 131.1 metres (430 ft 1 in) long, had a beam of 16.6 metres (54 ft 6 in) and had a depth of 9.8 metres (32 ft 2 in). She was assessed at 6,210 GRT and had one three-cylinder triple expansion steam engine driving a single screw propeller. The ship could generate 784 nominal horsepower with a speed of 12 knots (22 km/h; 14 mph). She was also armed with a 4-inch (100 mm) deck gun on the stern and four machine guns of which two were mounted on the bridge and two on the stern, all of which the crew were trained to handle.

== Sinking ==
Equipoise was travelling unescorted from Rio de Janeiro, Brazil, to Baltimore, United States, while carrying a cargo of 8,000 tons of Manganese ore when on 27 March 1942 at 02.38 am, she was hit by a torpedo from the German submarine U-160 in the Atlantic Ocean 60 nautical miles (110 km) south east of Cape Henry, Virginia, United States. The torpedo struck the ship on the starboard side between hatches number one and two and also blew out the bottom. The ship sank in two minutes which gave the crew only enough time to launch two lifeboats and two rafts. The first lifeboat however quickly capsized as it hit the water while the other was launched empty. In total nine survivors managed to board the empty lifeboat with a few others boarding the rafts.

The seriously injured captain died shortly after the sinking on board the lifeboat and was buried at sea, which made the third mate the only surviving officer of the ship. The 13 survivors were rescued two days after the sinking by USS Greer and brought to Norfolk Naval Base.

== Wreck ==
The wreck of Equipoise lies at 36°36′N 74°45′W.
