= Austropeplea hamiltoni =

Conservation status
- Data Deficit (NZ TCS)

Scientific classification
- Kingdom: Animalia
- Phylum: Mollusca
- Class: Gastropoda
- Superorder: Hygrophila
- Family: Lymnaeidae
- Genus: Austropeplea
- Species: A. hamiltoni

Binomial name
- Austropeplea hamiltoni (Dell, 1956)

Synonyms
- † Limnaea alfredi hamiltoni Dell, 1956 superseded rank

Species of gastropod

Austropeplea hamiltoni is a species of air-breathing freshwater snail in the family Lymnaeidae.

== Distribution ==
This species is endemic to New Zealand.
