= International Freighting Corporation =

Former US shipping company

International Freighting Corporation of New York City was a US shipping company whose main operations was chartered shipping from United States ports to South America. International Freighting Corporation owned and operated an ocean liner service called American Republics Line, with service from New York to South America. In 1920 Scovil Company took over the International Freighting Corporation. Scovil Company was founded in 1802 in Waterbury, Connecticut, operating a large brass plant. By 1956 Du Pont and General Motors Corporation were the two stock owners of International Freighting Corporation and Du Pont purchased General Motors shares. In 1957 International Charter Services was founded and took over the accounts and contracts of the troubled International Freighting Corporation.

- Ships:
- Cotati sunk by torpedo on September 30, 1942, off West Africa.
- Most ships chartered not owned

== World War II ==
International Freighting Corporation was active with charter shipping with the Maritime Commission and War Shipping Administration. During wartime, the International Freighting Corporation operated Victory ships and Liberty ships. The ship was run by its International Freighting Corporation crew and the United States Navy supplied United States Navy Armed Guards to man the deck guns and radio. The most common armament mounted on these merchant ships were the MK II 20mm Oerlikon autocannon and the 3"/50, 4"/50, and 5"/38 deck guns.

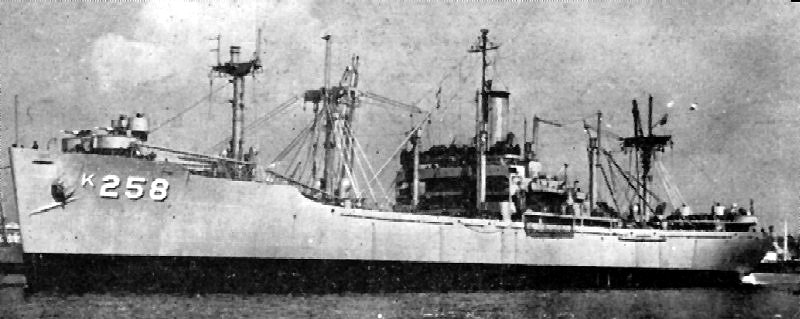
A Victory ship of World War II

Liberty ship of World War II

=== Victory ships ===
- Nampa Victory
- William and Mary Victory

=== Liberty ships ===
- Caesar Rodney
- Sonata
- Albert K. Smiley
- James Longstreet
- Sallie S. Cotten
- Equipoise, sunk by torpedo 27 March 1942
- Reginald A. Fessenden
- Roger Williams
- Nicholas Biddle
- Sarah J. Hale
- Ruben Dario
- Nathaniel Bacon
- Ole Bull
- Mary Ashley Townsend
- Milton J. Foreman
- Edwin L. Drake
- Ernest W. Gibson
- Ezra Weston
- John G. Tod
- Banner Seam
- Lyman Abbott
- William S. Halstead
- William Wirt
- Albert K. Smiley
- Andrew A. Humpreys
- James D. Trask
- James Longstreet, ran ashore off New Jersey at 40.27N 74.00W on October 27, 1943, later refloated and sank as gunnery target.
- James D. Trask
- John A. Poor, was sunk by torpedo by U-510 in the Indian Ocean at 13.58N 70.30E on March 19, 1944

=== Other ships ===
- Lammot du Pont

== American Republics Line ==
International Freighting Corporation sold its American Republics Line to the United States Maritime Commission in 1926. In 1946 the line was sold to Moore-McCormack. American Republics Line then became a Mooremack subsidiary. American Republics Line was called The Good Neighbor Fleet.

- American Republics Line ports: New York, Rio de Janeiro, Santos, Montevideo, Buenos Aires, Santos, and Trinidad.

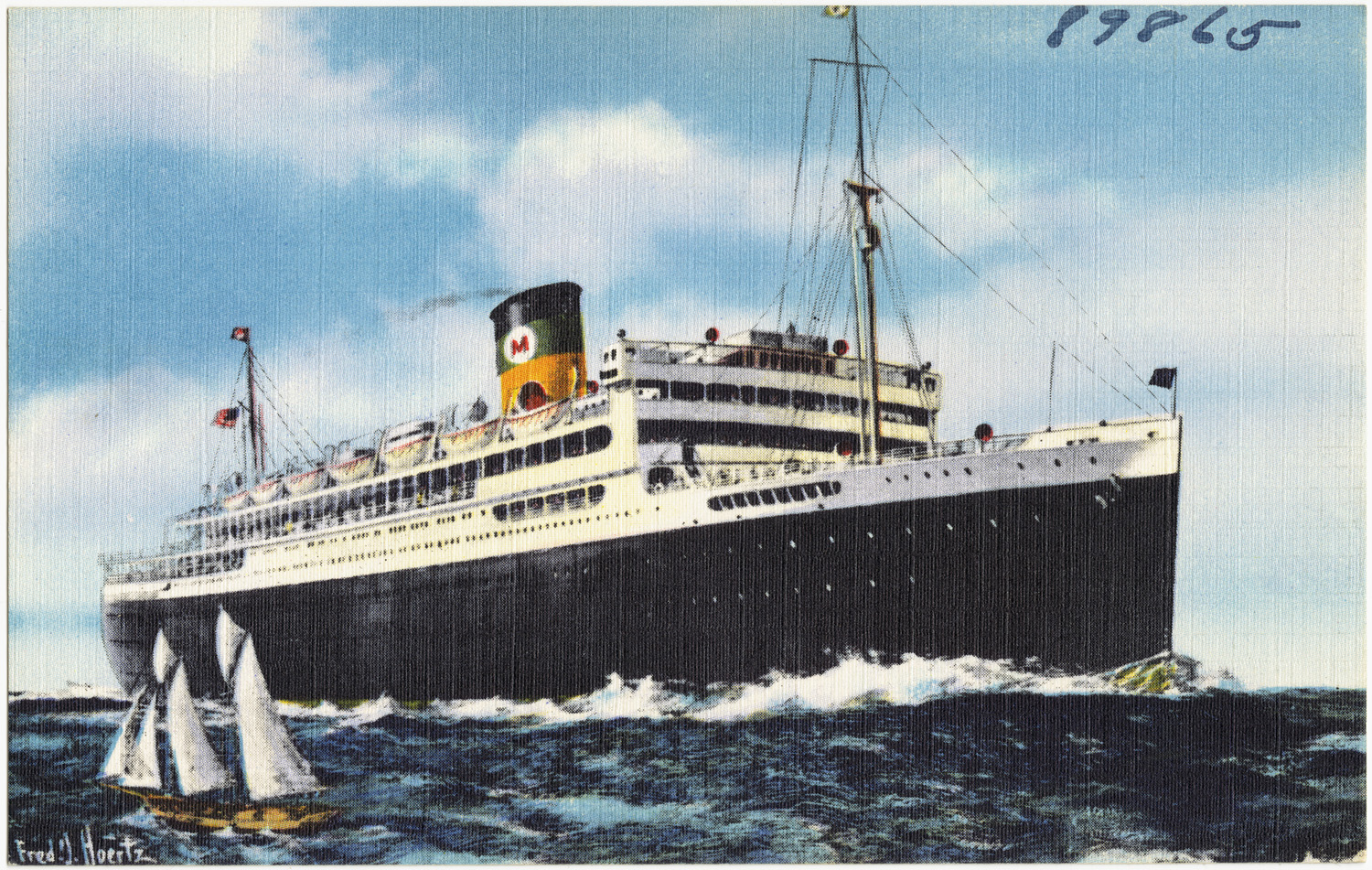
Moore-McCormack ran the "Good Neighbor Fleet" liners Uruguay, Brazil and Argentina between New York and the east coast of South America

=== Ships ===
- Argentina
- Brazil
- Uruguay
- Haleakala
- West Cawthon
- West Grama
- SS Mormacpenn

== International Charter Services ==
International Charter Services was founded in 1957. International Charter Services took over control of the International Freighting Corporation and shipping in 1957. International Charter Services operated airline service from 1957 to 1965 with service to North America, Europe, India, and South Africa. In 1959 Swissair acquired a 40% share of Balair. In 1965 International Charter Services turned over air service Belair - Swissair to Swissair until 1971. In 1971 International Charter Services sold its shares in Belair.

== D. & H. Scovil Company ==
D. & H. Scovil Company was founded in 1844, by Daniel and Hezekiah Scovil and closed in 1942. Scovil came up with a self-sharpening hoe, called Scovil’s Planters. Scovil’s Planters used a layer of brass and iron to achieve a self-sharpening edge. The company started in a small blacksmith shop and grew into a large factory. The factory was sold to the State of Connecticut in 1942.

== See also ==
- American Export Lines
- World War II United States Merchant Navy
