= Sonia Cotten =

Canadian writer

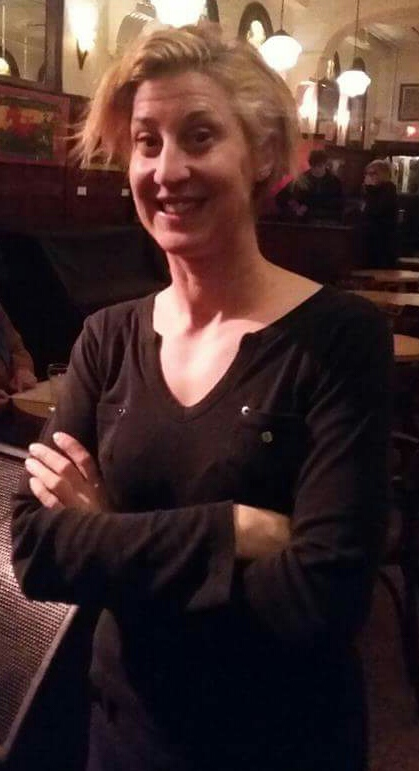
- Born: September 13, 1974 (age 51) Rouyn-Noranda, Quebec, Canada
- Genre: poetry

Sonia Cotten (born September 13, 1974) is a Canadian writer living in Quebec.

She was born in Rouyn-Noranda and studied human resource management, editorial practices and business communications at the Université du Québec à Montréal. Cotten was employed at the Maison de la culture Pointe-aux-Trembles and at the Cégep de l'Abitibi-Témiscamingue.

In 2002, she published her first poetry collection Changer le Bronx en or. She has also contributed to various poetry magazines. In 2015, she received the Prix Geneviève-Amyot for her poem Pour Jean-Paul Daoust.

== Selected works ==
Sources:

- Nique à feu (2006)
- Mon chef c’est mon cœur (2009)
- Ovalta (2011)
- Marcher dans le ciel, children's book (2015)
