= Charles Cotton (disambiguation) =

Charles Cotton (1630–1687) was an English poet.

Charles Cotton may also refer to:

- Sir Charles Cotton, 5th Baronet (1753–1812), British Royal Navy admiral
- Charles S. Cotton (1843–1909), American Navy rear admiral
- Sir Charles Cotton (geologist) (1885–1970), New Zealand geologist and geomorphologist
- Charles L. Cotton (born 1949), president of the National Rifle Association of America (NRA)
- Charlie Cotton, fictional character in British soap opera, EastEnders
- Charlie Cotton (2014 character), a later fictional character in British soap opera, EastEnders
- Charles Cotton (footballer) (1880–1910), English footballer who played as a goalkeeper
