= A. V. Coton =

A. V. Coton (16 February 1906 – 7 July 1969), born Edward Haddakin, was an English ballet critic and writer.

Born in York, he initially worked as a merchant seaman and a policeman before forging a career as a ballet critic in 1935. In 1938, he helped with the formation of Antony Tudor's London Ballet company and later helped with its revival. The same year he married Lillian Turner.

During the Second World War, he worked as a light rescue worker in Westminster.

In 1954, he became the ballet critic for The Daily Telegraph, where he mentored Kathrine Sorley Walker.

He died of cancer in 1969.
