= SS Sallie S. Cotten =

United States WWII Liberty Ship

History

United States
- Name: Sallie S. Cotten
- Namesake: Sallie Southall Cotten
- Builder: North Carolina Shipbuilding Company, Wilmington, North Carolina
- Laid down: 13 April 1943
- Launched: 7 May 1943
- Renamed: Ole Bull
- Fate: Scrapped 1967

General characteristics
- Type: Liberty ship
- Tonnage: 7,000 long tons deadweight (DWT)
- Length: 441 ft 6 in (134.57 m)
- Beam: 56 ft 11 in (17.35 m)
- Draft: 27 ft 9 in (8.46 m)
- Propulsion: Two oil-fired boilers; Triple expansion steam engine; Single screw; 2,500 hp (1,864 kW)
- Speed: 11 knots (20 km/h; 13 mph)
- Capacity: 9,140 tons cargo
- Complement: 41
- Armament: 1 × Stern-mounted 4 in (100 mm) deck gun; AA guns

SS Sallie S. Cotten (MC contract 1969) was a Liberty ship built in the United States during World War II. She was named after Sallie Southall Cotten, writer and clubwoman living in North Carolina. After being launched, the Cotten was renamed Ole Bull after the Norwegian violin virtuoso.

The ship was laid down by North Carolina Shipbuilding Company in their Cape Fear River yard on April 13, 1943, and launched on May 7, 1943. Bull was chartered to the International Freighting Corporation by the War Shipping Administration until October 1946 when she was purchased by the Royal Norwegian government. The vessel was scrapped in 1967.
