= Frank Cotton =

Australian psychologist (1890–1955)

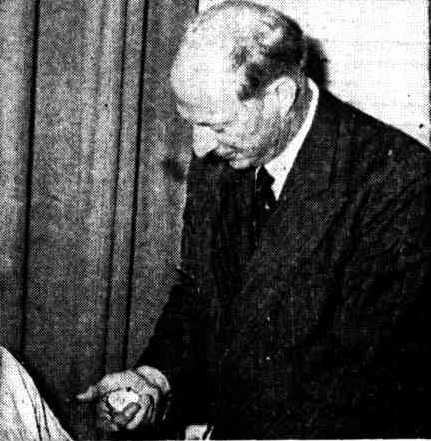
- Professor Frank Stanley Cotton c1950
- Born: Frank Stanley Cotton; 30 April 1890; Camperdown, New South Wales, Australia
- Died: 23 August 1955 (aged 65); Hornsby, New South Wales, Australia
- Citizenship: Australian
- Spouse: Catherine Drummond Smith

Frank Stanley Cotton (30 April 1890 – 23 August 1955) was an Australian lecturer in physiology, specialising in the study of the effects of physical strain on the human body.

== Early life ==
Cotton was born on 30 April 1890 at Camperdown, Sydney, New South Wales. His father was the Australian politician Francis Cotton (1857–1942) who was a strong proponent of Georgism and played a key role in the rise of the Labour movement. He was the younger brother of Shackleton expeditioner and geology professor, Leo Arthur Cotton (1883–1963). Pioneer art photographer Olive Cotton was his niece. He attended Sydney Boys High School from 1904 to 1908. In 1917, Cotton married Catherine Drummond Smith, who was one of the first two female geology demonstrators who taught at the University of Sydney. They had two sons.

== Inventions ==
Anti-Gravity Suit

In 1940, whilst at the University of Sydney, Professor Cotton invented the "Cotton aerodynamic anti-G flying suit" (G-suit), which prevented pilots from blacking out when making high speed turns or pulling out of a dive. This was used extensively by pilots in the Allied air forces during World War II.

Ergometer

Cotton was also responsible for the ergometer, a machine to test the athletic potential of sportsmen and women. Cotton claimed through this machine to have discovered the swimmers Jon Henricks and Judy-Joy Davies. The Australian swimming coach, Forbes Carlile, began his career as an assistant to Cotton.

== Later life ==
On 23 August 1955, Cotton died at Hornsby, New South Wales.

== See also ==
- List of members of the International Swimming Hall of Fame
- Sidney Cotton (believed to be related)
