= Cotton (nickname) =

Cotton is the nickname of:

- Cotton Davidson (1931-2022), American National Football League (NFL) quarterback for the Baltimore Colts
- Cotton Fitzsimmons (1931–2004), American college and NBA basketball coach
- Cotton Ivy (1930–2021), American humorist, comedian and entertainer who served in the Tennessee House of Representatives
- Cotton Knaupp (1889–1967), American Major League Baseball (MLB) shortstop
- Cotton Letner (1937–2009), American football player
- Cotton Minahan (1882–1958), American MLB pitcher, and track and field athlete who competed at the 1900 Summer Olympics in Paris
- Cotton Nash (1942–2023), American MLB outfielder and National Basketball Association (NBA) forward
- Cotton Owens (1924–2012), American NASCAR driver
- Cotton Pippen (1911–1981), American MLB pitcher for the St. Louis Cardinals (1936), Philadelphia Athletics (1939), and Detroit Tigers (1939–40)
- Cotton Priddy (1928–1956), American NASCAR Grand National race car driver from Louisville, Kentucky
- Cotton Speyrer (born 1949), American NFL wide receiver for the Baltimore Colts and the Miami Dolphins
- Cotton Tierney (1894–1953), American MLB second baseman and third baseman for the Pittsburgh Pirates, Philadelphia Phillies, Boston Braves, and Brooklyn Robins
- Cotton Warburton (1911–1982), American film and television editor with sixty feature film credits with Metro-Goldwyn-Mayer Studios (MGM)

== See also ==
- Cotton (surname) people with surname
