= William Cotton =

William Cotton may refer to:

- William Cotton (artist) (1880–1958), American artist and playwright
- William Cotton (MP for Cambridgeshire) (fl. 1439-1454), see Cambridgeshire (UK Parliament constituency)
- William Cotton (MP for Newport, Isle of Wight) (in the 1590s), see Newport (Isle of Wight) (UK Parliament constituency)
- William Cotton (archdeacon of Totnes) (fl. 1621), Anglican priest
- William Cotton (bishop) (died 1621), bishop of Exeter, 1598–1621
- William Cotton (inventor) (1819–1887), inventor of a knitting machine
- William Cotton (ironmaster) died 1675, husband of Anna Cotton
- William Cotton (banker) (1786–1866), Governor of the Bank of England, 1842–1845
- William Cotton (missionary) (1813–1879), Anglican priest and beekeeper
- William F. Cotton (1897–2006), central Louisiana businessman
- William Francis Cotton (died 1917), Irish politician
- William R. Cotton, American meteorologist
- Sir William Cotton (Conservative politician) (1822–1902), British politician, Lord Mayor of London, member of parliament for City of London 1874–1885
- Will Cotton (born 1965), American painter
- Bill Cotton (1928–2008), British television producer
- Billy Cotton (1899–1969), bandleader, father of the above
- Billy Cotton (footballer, born 1894) (1894–1971), English footballer

== See also ==
- Harold Cotton (ice hockey) (William Harold Cotton, 1902–1984), Canadian professional ice hockey player
