= Carl Cotton =

African American taxidermist

- Born: April 10, 1918; South Side, Chicago
- Died: July 5, 1971 (aged 53)
- Occupation: Taxidermist
- Years active: 1947–1971
- Known for: Field Museum taxidermy exhibitions
- Notable work: Marsh Birds of the Upper Nile

Carl Cotton (1918–1971) was an American taxidermist known for his work on exhibition development at the Field Museum of Natural History from 1947 to 1971. He was the first African American taxidermist at the Field Museum and, as noted by museum staff, likely the first professional black taxidermist in all of Chicago.

== Early life and education ==
Born in 1918, Cotton spent his childhood in South Side, Chicago, in the area around Washington Park. He grew up around other children that would go on to have creative histories related to the art mecca they lived in, including local historian Timuel Black, poet and author Gwendolyn Brooks, and artist Charles White. Black discussed how he was childhood friends with Cotton and that, because of his young interest in the field of taxidermy, “cats and rats ran when they saw Carl.” He had already been practicing on the methods of stuffing and mounting already deceased small animals he found and, once his skills had improved enough, neighbors would bring their pets that had died to be stuffed as well. Cotton was noted by Black to have the desire to "preserve the image of other life besides human life". A school field trip to the Field Museum as a child was likely the inspiration for his desire to have a position there.

== Career ==
Cotton first wrote a letter to the Field Museum's director in 1940 to request a taxidermy job, saying that he was an amateur taxidermist that had an interest in working on reptiles and that he already had a personal collection of 30 live snakes he could use for the museum. His request was refused however, with the director noting that they had no openings in the department and that they usually required their taxidermists to have a graduate degree in the practice or existing professional experience and notoriety. During WWII, Cotton was involved in the naval service as a stenographer and, after returning, wrote another letter to the Field Museum in 1947, this time requesting to showcase his abilities as a volunteer. That was enough for him to be hired as a temporary assistant for the vertebrate anatomy department and after a month of presenting his skills, he became a full-time employee of the museum. His chosen specialty at the time was avians, with over a fourth of all the birds in the museum being prepared by Cotton.

He helped to create an adaptive coloring exhibit on birds, but Cotton also branched out into other organisms, working on mammals, reptiles, and eventually insects and the salmon display. In 1966, the museum opened its new official exhibitions department and made Cotton the first staff member, giving him the responsibility for preparing exhibits that represented the other departments individually and in collages. Some of the techniques he developed for taxidermy include how to replicate animals that have no hair on their skin, particularly reptiles, with one example being making a snapping turtle out of the bioplastic cellulose acetate. His skills also included an adept hand at mimicking plants out of other materials. His most famous full work was the Marsh Birds of the Upper Nile exhibit featuring several bird species from Uganda including the shoebill stork and a variety of marshy plants which were constructed out of wax along with the muddy terrain. This exhibition has remained on permanent display ever since it was first opened.

== Personal life ==
It was common for Cotton to practice taxidermy at home even throughout his museum career, working on outside commissions and other projects. While initially living in Gary, Indiana, during the 1950's and 60's with his family, he did move back into the city of Chicago proper in the years just before his death. An expansion of their garage in Gary was used as his personal home lab, with it being usual for large animals to be preserved there while being worked on. Cotton died of cancer in 1971.

== Legacy ==
An exhibition of Cotton's life and work was started in the summer of 2019 and unveiled in early 2020 under the title A Natural Talent: The Taxidermy of Carl Cotton to present his work throughout the years at the Field Museum, particularly the bird and reptile exhibits. A part of this exhibit included adding labels to all of his works throughout the museum, as it had been uncommon for taxidermists to have their names included on their works, which had contributed to records of Cotton's involvement having been previously lost in the museum's archives. It was only after several staff members, Reda Brooks and Tori Lee, had found photographical evidence of Cotton while looking for material to exhibit for Black History Month that the new exhibition was decided upon, unearthing the letters, reports, photos, and other pieces of Cotton's history at the museum that had been in the records.
