= USS Cotten =

Fletcher-class destroyer

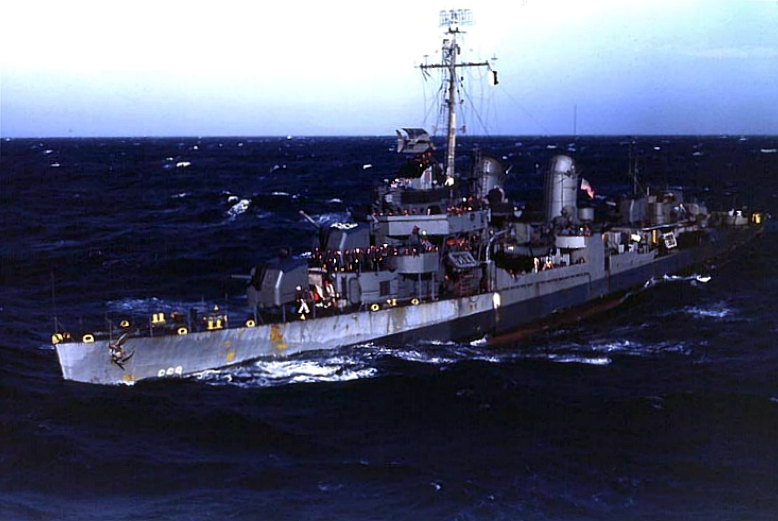
- USS Cotten (DD-669)

History

United States
- Namesake: Lyman A. Cotten
- Builder: Federal Shipbuilding and Drydock Company, Kearny, New Jersey
- Laid down: 8 February 1943
- Launched: 12 June 1943
- Commissioned: 24 July 1943
- Decommissioned: 2 May 1960
- Stricken: 1 December 1974
- Fate: Sold for scrap, 31 July 1975

General characteristics
- Class & type: Fletcher-class destroyer
- Displacement: 2,050 tons
- Length: 376 ft 6 in (114.7 m)
- Beam: 39 ft 8 in (12.1 m)
- Draft: 17 ft 9 in (5.4 m)
- Propulsion: 60,000 shp (45 MW); 2 propellers
- Speed: 35 knots (65 km/h)
- Range: 6500 nmi. (12,000 km); @ 15 kt
- Complement: 336
- Armament: 5 × 5 in (130 mm)/38 guns; 4 × 40 mm AA guns, 4 × 20 mm AA guns, 10 × 21 inch (533 mm) torpedo tubes, 6 × depth charge projectors, 2 × depth charge tracks

USS Cotten (DD-669) was a Fletcher-class destroyer of the United States Navy, named for Captain Lyman A. Cotten (1874–1926).

Cotten was launched 12 June 1943 by Federal Shipbuilding and Drydock Company, Kearny, New Jersey; sponsored by Mrs. L. A. Cotten, widow of Captain Cotten; and commissioned 24 July 1943.

== World War II ==
Departing Norfolk, Virginia 9 October 1943, Cotten arrived at Pearl Harbor 31 October. Here she joined the 5th Fleet, and on 10 November sortied for the invasion of the Gilbert Islands, screening the escort carriers providing air support and patrolling against submarines off Tarawa. Returning to Pearl Harbor 7 January 1944, she sailed with the vast Fast Carrier Task Force (then TF 58, later 3rd Fleet's TF 38) on 16 January for air strikes on the Marshalls on 29 and 30 January. Based at Majuro, Cotten participated in the Truk raid of 16 and 17 February; supported the landings at Emirau Island; and screened the carriers as they launched strikes on Palau, Yap, Ulithi and Woleai between 30 March and 1 April. Continuing her screening, she joined in covering the Hollandia operation from 21 to 24 April and air strikes on Truk, Satawan, and Ponape between 29 April and 1 May.

After a brief overhaul at Pearl Harbor, Cotten rejoined TF 58 for the invasion of the Marianas. She screened the carriers during air strikes on Saipan; sank a sampan 17 June; splashed a dive bomber making a run on Enterprise during the Battle of the Philippine Sea of 19 and 20 June; and screened air strikes on Guam, the Palaus, Yap, Ulithi, and the Bonins.

She sailed from Eniwetok 30 August 1944 for raids to neutralize Japanese bases in the Philippines during the invasion of the western Carolines, returning to Ulithi 1 October. Five days later she sortied with TF 38 for strikes on Okinawa, northern Luzon and Formosa from 10 to 14 October. When the crippled Canberra and Houston were used as lures to draw out the Japanese Fleet ("BaitDiv 1"), Cotten waited with the striking force, then from 15 October she operated in support of the Leyte landings as aircraft from her carriers struck Luzon repeatedly. She fought off the air attacks on the escort carriers during the Battle of Surigao Strait phase of the Battle for Leyte Gulf on 24, 25, and 26 October and joined in the pursuit of the remnants of the Japanese fleet after the battle. She rejoined TF 38 to pound Luzon from 5 November, survived 18 December typhoon which damaged the 3d Fleet, and arrived at Ulithi to repair storm damage and replenish 24 December.

On 30 December 1944 Cotten in TF 38 put to sea to support the invasion of Luzon by screening during strikes on Formosa, Luzon (6–7 January), Camranh Bay, Indo-China; Hong Kong and Canton; and the Nansei Shoto. On 10 February the task force (again TF 58) sortied to open the Iwo Jima operation with a strike on Honshū on 16 February, with Cotten on the advanced scouting line. They returned to Iwo Jima to fly cover over the invasion landings on 19 February. Except for screening another raid on Japan on 25 February and one on Okinawa on 1 March, Cotten remained on fire support duty off Iwo Jima until 28 March. With Dortch she swept the area for Japanese shipping on 14 and 15 March, sinking two enemy picket boats.

After overhaul and training on the west coast, Cotten sailed by way of Pearl Harbor for the raid on Wake Island of 6 August, called at Eniwetok and Guam, and anchored in Tokyo Bay 3 September. She remained in Japan carrying out a variety of occupation duties until 5 December when she sailed for home, arriving at San Diego, California 22 December and New York 17 January 1946. Cotten was placed out of commission in reserve at Charleston, South Carolina, 15 July 1946.

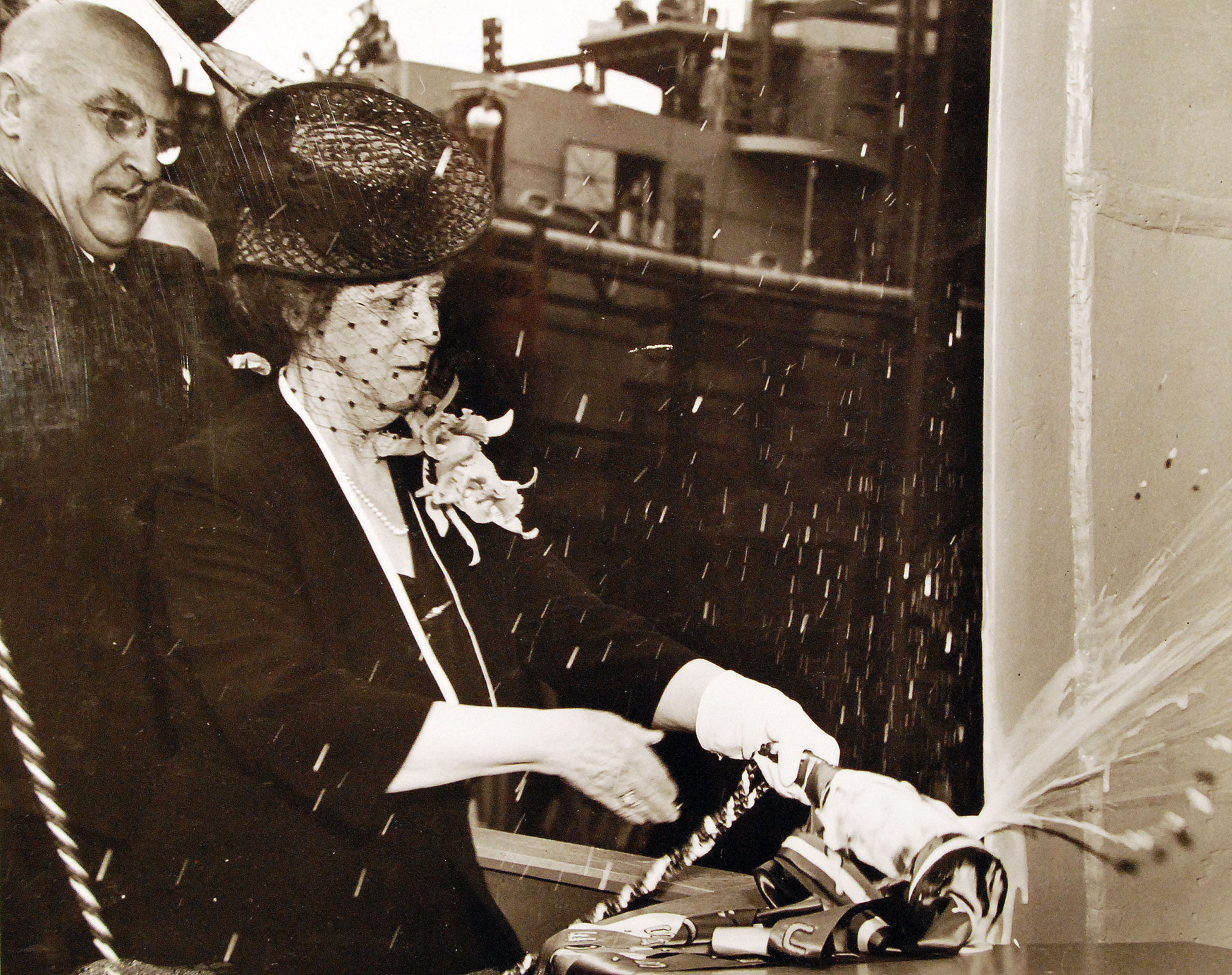
Elizabeth Brownrigg Henderson Cotten christens the USS Cotten on June 12, 1943.

The wartime exploits of Cotten are the subject of the memoir 200,000 Miles Aboard the Destroyer Cotten by C. Snelling Robinson who served aboard her during World War II. ISBN 0873386450 ISBN 978-0873386456.

== 1951 – 1960 ==
Recommissioned 3 July 1951, Cotten conducted operations in the Caribbean and acted as plane guard at Mayport, Fla., before sailing from her homeport of Newport, R.I. 18 May 1953 for a tour of duty in the western Pacific during which she patrolled off Korea. Sailing westward from Japan to complete a round-the-world cruise, she arrived home 15 January 1954. Local operations and exercises in the Caribbean were followed by a tour with the 6th Fleet in the Mediterranean from 28 July to 28 November 1955. On 4 January 1957 she departed Newport for a new area of operations. Calling at Trinidad, Freetown, Mombasa, Karachi, and Aden, Cotten operated between Massawa and Aden, Cape Town, and Freetown before returning to Newport 1 July 1957. On 3 September she sailed for 6th Fleet duty in the Mediterranean. Returning to Newport 27 November, Cotten continued east coast and Caribbean operations until making a final tour of duty in the Mediterranean, Red Sea, and Persian Gulf between March and November 1959. On 2 May 1960, she was decommissioned and placed in reserve at Norfolk, Virginia

Cotten was stricken from the Naval Vessel Register 1 December 1974. She was sold 31 July 1975 and broken up for scrap.

== Awards ==
Cotten received nine battle stars for World War II service and one for Korean War service.
