= Lyman A. Cotten =

American naval officer

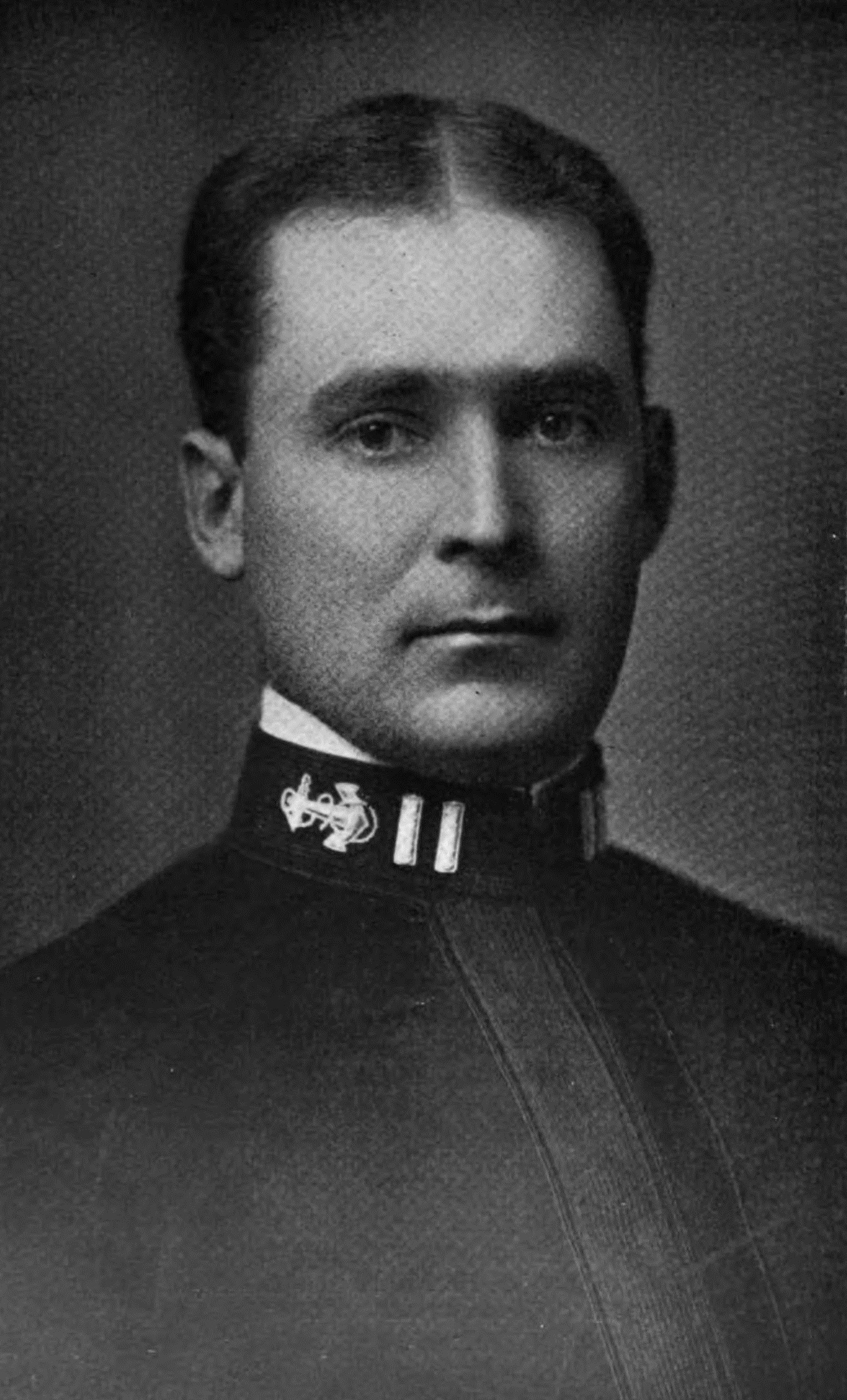

Personal details
- Born: December 18, 1874 Wilson, North Carolina, U.S.
- Died: January 12, 1926 (aged 51) Norfolk, Virginia, U.S.
- Resting place: Arlington National Cemetery
- Spouse: Elizabeth Brownrigg Henderson
- Children: 2
- Parent(s): Robert Randolph Cotten (father); Sallie Sims Southall (mother)
- Education: United States Naval Academy; Naval War College
- Occupation: military officer
- Awards: Navy Distinguished Service Medal

Military service
- Allegiance: United States of America
- Branch/service: United States Navy
- Years of service: 1898–1926

Lyman Atkinson Cotten (December 18, 1874 – January 12, 1926) was an officer of the United States Navy.

== Biography ==
Cotten was born 18 December 1874 in Wilson, N.C. to Robert Randolph Cotten and Sallie Sims Southall Cotten. His father was a Confederate States Army Colonel and later served as both state representative and state senator.

Cotten studied at Bronson's School in Warrenton and Horner's School in Oxford. He entered the United States Naval Academy in 1894, graduating with the class of 1898. His graduation occurred two months early due to the impending Spanish–American War, in which he also participated. After serving at sea, he studied at the Naval War College, and was naval attaché to Japan and China. In World War I, he was awarded the Navy's Distinguished Service Medal for establishing and commanding the naval base at Plymouth, England.

He married Elizabeth Brownrigg Henderson on July 16, 1908.

Further service in command at sea, on staff duty, and again as naval attaché in Tokyo preceded important duties in Washington, D.C. He wrote several articles for the United States Naval Institute's Proceedings, one of which, "Commerce Destroying in War", won the Institute's Gold Medal in 1917. He also wrote a number of songs that proved popular among Navy sailors.

While at sea commanding Richmond (CL-9) he collapsed with a high fever. He was put ashore at the Naval Hospital at Norfolk, Virginia, where he died of pneumonia on 12 January 1926. His body was transferred to Arlington National Cemetery, where he is buried in Section 4, Plot 3331.

== Legacy ==
In 1943, the destroyer USS Cotten (DD-669) was named in his honor.
