= Sallie Southall Cotten =

American writer and clubwoman

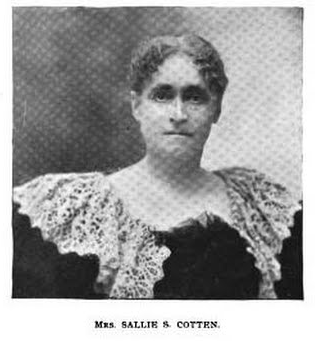
- Cotten, from an 1896 publication.
- Born: Sallie Swepson Sims Southall; June 13, 1846; Lawrenceville, Virginia, U.S.
- Died: May 4, 1929 (aged 82); Winchester, Massachusetts, U.S.
- Education: Greensboro Female College
- Occupation: writer
- Spouse: Robert Randolph Cotten (1866–1928; his death)
- Children: 9 (including Lyman A. Cotten)

Sallie Swepson Sims Southall Cotten (June 13, 1846 – May 4, 1929) was an American writer and clubwoman based in North Carolina. She helped to organize the North Carolina Federation of Women's Clubs. She was the organization's fifth president, and wrote the federation's anthem and a history of the federation.

== Early life and education ==
Cotten was born Sallie Swepson Sims Southall in Lawrenceville, Virginia, the daughter of Thomas J. Southall and Susanna Sims Southall. She was raised in the home of an uncle in Murfreesboro, North Carolina. She attended Wesleyan Female College (which closed during her time there, in the tumult of the American Civil War) and Greensboro Female College, graduating from the latter in 1863.

== Career ==
In her mid-forties, Sallie Cotten accepted an appointment from governor Elias Carr to serve as one of North Carolina's managers at the 1893 Chicago World's Columbian Exposition. "I had never traveled much, and felt utterly unprepared," she confessed to the Charlotte Observer, "but I soon felt at home...and I found that the years of home duties had fitted me for the fields of larger service." She decided to focus on books written by North Carolina women for her part of the exhibit, spent four months in Chicago, and received a medal for her contributions. As a result, she wrote the book The White Doe (1901), which begins with a history of America, and continues with the Indian legend of the white doe as poetry. This work and the travel involved led her to greater involvement with the women's club movement, and in 1902 she helped to organize the North Carolina Federation of Women's Clubs. She was the organization's fifth president (1912-1913), and wrote the federation's anthem.

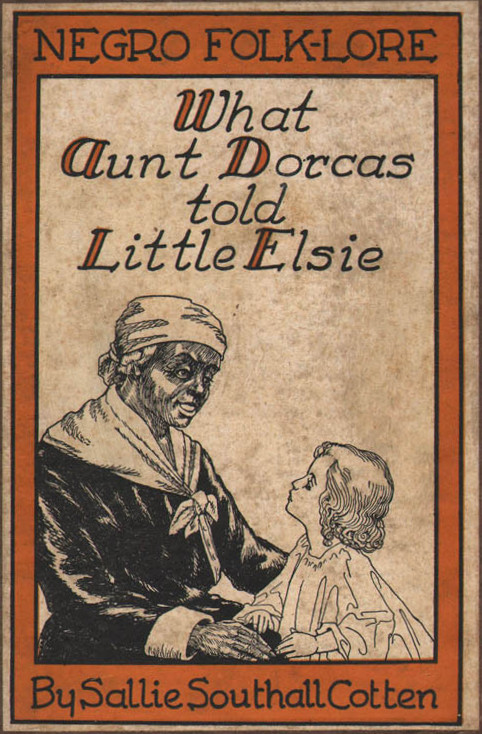
What Aunt Dorcas told Little Elsie, Sallie Southall Cotten, 1923

She was one of the organizers of the National Congress of Mothers (later the National Parent-Teacher Association), and was an officer of the national organization from 1897 to 1906.

In 1925 she published The History of the North Carolina Federation of Women's Clubs, 1901-1925, with the opening line "What has been known as the Woman's Movement was a revolution — bloodless but not purposeless." Among her other publications were The White Doe (1901), an epic poem about Virginia Dare, which she often presented in public readings; and What Aunt Dorcas Told Little Elsie (1923), a collection of "Negro folklore stories" which reflected the condescending racial attitudes of a nostalgic white Southerner in her time.

== Personal life ==
Cotten was a member of the United Daughters of the Confederacy. She married Col. Robert Randolph Cotten in 1866. Her husband was a Confederate Army veteran. The couple lived in Wilson, North Carolina, and later at "Cottendale," their 1000-acre plantation in Pitt County. The couple had nine children together including Naval officer Lyman A. Cotten; three of their children died in childhood. She was widowed in 1928, and moved to Massachusetts, where she was welcomed as "the Julia Ward Howe of the South." She died there, in Winchester, Massachusetts, in 1929, aged 83 years.

Her papers are archived in the Southern Historical Collection at Chapel Hill. There are dormitories named for Sallie Southall Cotten at University of North Carolina at Greensboro and at East Carolina University. There is a highway historical marker about Cotten in Pitt County, near the site of her former home. The Junior Woman's Club of Raleigh offers a Sallie Southall Cotten Scholarship for North Carolina students. During World War II, the Liberty ship SS Sallie S. Cotten was named after her.

A book-length biography, Sallie Southall Cotten: A Woman's Life in North Carolina, was published in 1987.
