= David Cotton =

American businessman

- Born: David B. Cotton; 1950 or 1951 (age 75–76)
- Education: Loma Linda University
- Occupation: Businessman
- Known for: Former owner of Meridian Health Plans
- Spouse: Shery Cotton
- Children: 3 sons and 1 daughter

David B. Cotton (born 1950/1951) is an American billionaire businessman, and the former owner, chairman and CEO of Meridian Health Plans.

== Early life ==
Cotton earned an MD degree from Loma Linda University in 1974. He trained as a medical doctor, specializing as a gynecologist.

== Career ==
He was specialist-in-chief of obstetrics and gynecology at the Detroit Medical Center until 1997.

In 1997, Cotton and his wife Shery Cotton founded Meridian Health Plans in Detroit, Michigan. Cotton and his family owned Meridian for two decades, growing it into the largest private provider of Medicaid benefits in Michigan and Illinois.

In May 2018, WellCare Health Plans Inc announced that it was buying Meridian for US$2.5 billion.

== Personal life ==
Cotton has three sons and one daughter. In August 2007, their son Jon Cotton was promoted to corporate president of Meridian. Their son Sean Cotton was chief legal counsel of Meridian, and son Michael Cotton was president of Meridian Health Plan of Illinois.
