= Cotton (disambiguation) =

Cotton is a soft, staple fiber that can be spun and woven into a textile of the same name.

Cotton may also refer to:

- Gossypium, the cotton plant

== Geography ==
=== United Kingdom ===
- Cotton, Cheshire, a village in Cheshire
- Cotton Edmunds, a village in Cheshire
- Cotton End, a village in Bedfordshire
- Cotton End, Northampton, a suburb
- Cotton, Staffordshire, a village in the Staffordshire Moorlands, England
- Cotton, Suffolk, an English civil parish
- Far Cotton, a suburb of Northampton

=== United States ===
- Cotton, Georgia
- Cotton, Minnesota
- Cotton County, Oklahoma

== People ==
=== Given name ===
- Cotton Fitzsimmons (1931–2004), American basketball coach
- Cotton Mather (1663-1728), New England Puritan
- Cotton Weary, fictional character in the Scream franchise

=== Nickname ===
- Cotton (nickname), a list of people with the nickname

=== Surname ===
- Cotton (surname), a list of people with the surname

== Business and organizations ==
- Cotton (motorcycle), British motorcycle manufacturer
- Cotton Incorporated, fabric organization

== Art, entertainment, and media ==
- Cotton library, the collection of medieval manuscripts by Robert Bruce Cotton
- Cotton (album)
- Cotton (series), a video game series
  - Cotton: Fantastic Night Dreams, the first game in the series
- Cotton Hill, a character on King of the Hill

== See also ==
- Cotton Patch Goose, a breed of domestic goose
- Coton (disambiguation)
- Cotten
- Nitrocellulose, sometimes called guncotton
