= Catherine Drummond Smith =

Australian geologist (1888–1979)

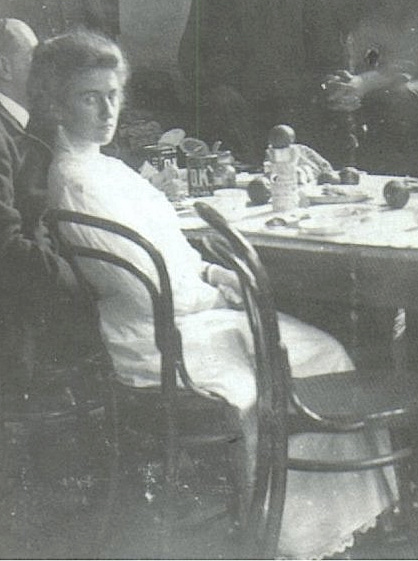
- Catherine Drummond Smith seated in the Sydney University geology department (1910)
- Born: 1888
- Died: 30 June 1979 (aged 90–91); New South Wales, Australia
- Other name: Catherine Drummond Cotton
- Education: University of Sydney
- Occupation: Geologist
- Known for: "Ludwig Leichhardt and the Great South Land" (1938)
- Spouse: Frank Cotton
- Children: 2

Catherine Drummond Smith (1888–30 June 1979) (also known as Catherine Drummond Cotton) was an Australian geologist and one of the first two female geology demonstrators employed by the University of Sydney in 1911.

== Biography ==
She was born about 1888 to William and Catherine Smith. In 1911, she obtained her Bachelor of Science degree at the University of Sydney and graduated with first-class honours and the University's medal in geology. That same year, she became one of the first two women hired by administrator Edgeworth David as demonstrators in the University's geology department. She remained in that post until she left in 1919.

On 25 August 1917, she married physiologist Frank Cotton at Hornsby, New South Wales, and she sometimes became known by her married name Catherine Drummond Cotton. She had two sons.

In 1938, she published her only known book, about the German 19th-century explorer, Ludwig Leichhardt, who disappeared during his second expedition in Australia. Her research included translating letters Leichhardt wrote to his family between 1834 and 1841.

She died on 30 June 1979 in New South Wales.

== Works ==
- Cotton, Catherine Drummond Smith, Ludwig Leichhardt and the Great South Land (1938).
