= Robert Bell Cotton =

American politician (1859–1917)

Member of the Mississippi House of Representatives from the Alcorn County district
- In office 1911-1917
- Preceded by: W. T. Bennet
- Succeeded by: J. R. Hill

Personal details
- Born: June 8, 1859 Tippah County, Mississippi, U.S.
- Died: 1917 (aged 57–58) Alcorn County, Mississippi, U.S.
- Party: Democratic

Robert Bell Cotton (June 8, 1859 - 1917) was a Democratic member of the Mississippi House of Representatives, representing Alcorn County, from 1911 until his death.

== Biography ==
Robert Bell Cotton was born on June 8, 1859, in Tippah County, Mississippi, to James Madison Cotton and Martha Ellen (Bell) Cotton. He married Eldora Wiggs in 1885. He was elected to the Mississippi House of Representatives, representing Alcorn County, in 1911 in a special election to choose the successor of W. T. Bennet and served in the 1911 session. He was re-elected to the House in 1911 and 1915. He was a Democrat. He died in Alcorn County, Mississippi, in 1917, and was replaced by J. R. Hill.
