= USS Griffin =

Tender of the United States Navy

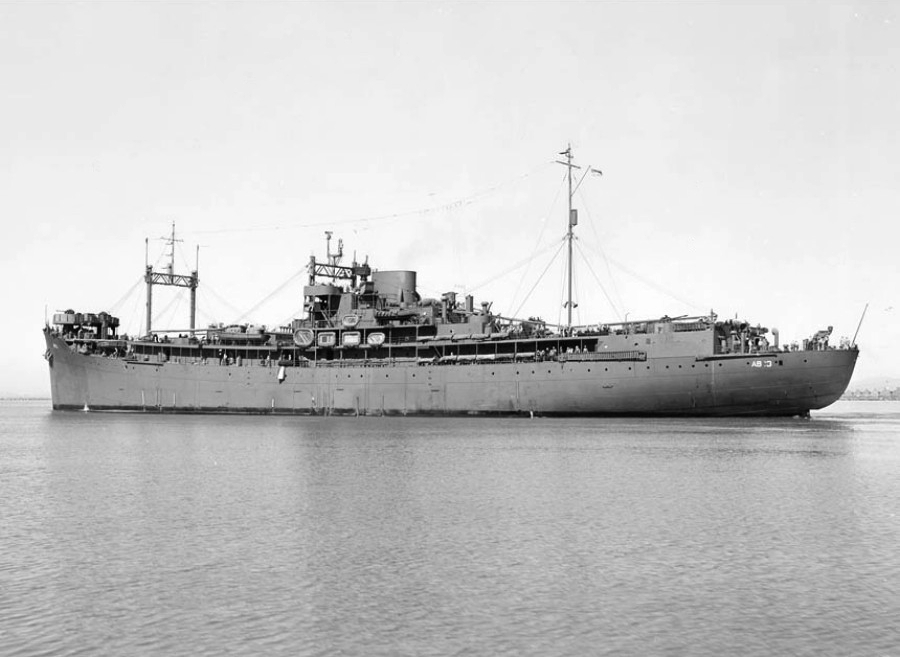

History

United States
- Namesake: Rear Admiral Robert Stanislaus Griffin
- Builder: Sun Shipbuilding & Dry Dock, Chester, Pennsylvania; Converted by Robins Dry Dock and Repair Company, Brooklyn, New York
- Launched: 11 October 1939
- Acquired: 1940
- Commissioned: 31 July 1941
- Decommissioned: 12 October 1945
- Stricken: 1 August 1972
- Fate: Sold for scrapping, 9 April 1973

General characteristics
- Class & type: Converted Type C3 ship
- Length: 492 ft (149.96 m)
- Beam: 71 ft (21.64 m)
- Draft: 25.8333 ft (7.87 m)
- Propulsion: 8,500hp diesel, 1 shaft (details)
- Speed: 17 knots
- Complement: 911
- Armament: four single 3 in (76 mm) caliber DP gun mounts; one single 5"/51 caliber gun

USS Griffin (AS-13), originally Mormacpenn, a United States Maritime Commission Type C3 pre-war cargo ship, was launched by Sun Shipbuilding & Dry Dock, Chester, Pennsylvania, 11 October 1939. She served briefly with Moore-McConnack, Inc., was acquired by the Navy in 1940, renamed Griffin (AS-13) and converted to a submarine tender at Robbins Dry Dock and Repair Company, Brooklyn, N.Y. Griffin commissioned 31 July 1941.

Her conversion completed in September 1941, Griffin conducted shakedown off the East Coast and sailed with a sub squadron to Newfoundland 22 November 1941. Recalled to Newport, Rhode Island, after Pearl Harbor, the ship was assigned to the United States Pacific Fleet, and departed 14 February 1942 for Australia.

Griffin arrived Brisbane 15 April 1942 to tend Submarine Squadron 5. Early in the war, the United States developed a major submarine base in Australia; and submarines tended by Griffin struck hard at Japanese shipping while surface forces strengthened themselves for the first Pacific offensives. During this period, Griffin also repaired badly needed merchant ships. The tender departed Brisbane for the Fiji Islands 11 November 1942 and 1 December 1942 sailed to Bora Bora to escort Submarine Division 53 to the Panama Canal Zone. Arriving Balboa 7 January 1943, Griffin continued north to Oakland, California, arriving 20 January 1943.

After repairs at San Diego, California, Griffin again departed for the Pacific, sailing 27 April 1943. She arrived Pearl Harbor 4 May 1943 to take up her vital support duties, and remained until 3 January 1944. The ship performed refits, battle repairs, and general upkeep on submarines before sailing to Mare Island to arrive 10 January 1944.

Griffin returned to Pearl Harbor 17 March 1944, and departed 8 April 1944 for the great submarine base at Fremantle, Western Australia. She arrived 8 May and immediately set about servicing the growing submarine fleet. The tender remained at Fremantle until 20 November 1944. During her stay, the crew established a rubber fabrication shop there to address shortages of rubber parts among the submarine fleet. Griffin then moved closer to the Japanese shipping lanes at Mios Woendi, New Guinea, arriving 9 December 1944. There she tended submarines, surface craft of all kinds, and even lent her repair equipment to shore facilities. Griffin remained at Mios Woendi until 1 February 1945 when she sailed for Subic Bay, via Leyte.

Arriving 10 February 1945, Griffin set up one of the first Allied submarine repair facilities in the Philippines since they had been surrendered in 1942. She also helped to salvage damaged destroyer La Vallette (DD-448). Shifting base, the tender sailed 22 March 1945 via Leyte, and arrived in the Hawaiian Islands 10 April 1945. After a brief stay at Pearl Harbor, she departed 10 May 1945 for Midway, arrived 4 days later, and set up another repair facility for submarines. By that time, the submarines supported by Griffin had practically annihilated Japanese merchant shipping and had played a decisive role in the great Pacific offensive. She remained at Midway until 10 September 1945, then sailed to Pearl Harbor and San Francisco, entering the bay 24 September. Decommissioned at Mare Island 12 October 1945, the ship was placed in reserve. Later she transferred to the Stockton group, Pacific Reserve Fleet, where she remained in reserve, in service, tending reserve submarines, until at least 1967.

She was stricken in 1972 and transferred to MARAD. She was sold in 1973.
