= Tomas Batuecas =

Spanish chemist

Tomás Batuecas Marugán
- Born: 7 March 1893; Aldeanueva del Camino
- Died: 21 October 1972 (age 78 or 79); Santiago de Compostela
- Education: Complutense University of Madrid
- Known for: Determination of atomic weights
- Scientific career
- Fields: Physical chemistry
- Workplaces: University of Santiago de Compostela
- Doctoral advisor: Blas Cabrera Felipe

Tomás Batuecas Marugán (1893–1972) was a Spanish chemist, most notable for his work on atomic weights of the elements. Batuecas was a professor of chemistry and vice-chancellor of the University of Santiago de Compostela.

== Life ==
He graduated with honors from the Faculty of Sciences at the University of Salamanca in 1913 and in the same year began doctoral studies in Madrid under Blas Cabrera Felipe. In 1916, Batuecas studied in the University of Geneva with Philippe A. Guye where he was interested in density and compressibility of real gases. In Geneva he also met Enrique Moles Ormella, who became his long-standing research colleague.

In 1917, he presented his doctoral thesis at the University of Madrid and then returned for a brief period to the University of Geneva to teach chemistry. On his return to the Complutense University of Madrid, he continued his work on properties of gases with Cabrera and Moles. In 1932, Batuecas joined the University of Santiago, where he remained until his retirement in 1963. In 1936, he was appointed Vice-Chancellor.

During his career, Batuecas published more than 130 scientific papers. His research mainly involved determinations of atomic weights, either using density measurements of gases or X-ray crystallography. The work on atomic weights started in Geneva in 1916 with Guye, and was focused to evaluate Daniel Berthelot’s method of limiting densities for real gases. In Madrid (1924) Batuecas also became interested in X-ray crystallography to determine the atomic weights of elements.

The most notable contribution of Batuecas in this field is perhaps his role in the adoption of the international scale of atomic weights based on the carbon-12 nuclide. Batuecas was the chairman of the International Atomic Weights Commission from 1960–1963 and, in 1961, at the International Union of Pure and Applied Chemistry (IUPAC) General Assembly held in Montreal, he played a decisive role in establishing the new atomic mass scale.

== Honors ==
The city of Santiago, where Batuecas lived for 40 years, awarded him the silver medal of the city on the eve of his death. A street is named after him in Santiago. and in his hometown.
