= Felisa Martín Bravo =

Spanish physicist and meteorologist (1898–1979)

- Martín in 1940
- Born: 11 June 1898; San Sebastián, Basque Region, Spain
- Died: 29 October 1979 (aged 81); Madrid, Spain
- Spouse: José Vallejo Sánchez

Academic background
- Education: University of Madrid (BA, PhD)
- Thesis: Determination of the crystalline structure of nickel, cobalt, and lead sulfide oxides (in Spanish) (1926)
- Doctoral advisor: Julio Palacios

Academic work
- Institutions: Connecticut College; Middlebury College; State Meteorological Agency
- Main interests: X-ray diffraction; crystal structure; atmospheric electricity; meteorology

Felisa Martín Bravo (11 June 1898 – 29 October 1979) was a Basque and Spanish physicist. In 1926, she became the first woman to earn a doctorate in physics in Spain. Martín worked on x-ray crystallography and conducted the first characterizations of the crystal structures of nickel oxide, cobalt oxide, and lead(II) sulfide.

She is considered the first female meteorologist in Spain, as she was the first woman to join Spain's State Meteorological Agency as a scientist. She studied atmospheric electricity there until her retirement. In 1973, she became the first woman to become president of the Spanish Meteorological Association.

== Early life and education ==
Martín was born in San Sebastián, capital of the Basque region in Spain, in 1898 to Enrique Martín and Rosalía Bravo. She and her younger sister, named Rosalía after their mother, were raised in the Amara Berri neighborhood of San Sebastián. She completed secondary education at the Gipuzkoa General and Technical Institute, where she showed an affinity for mathematics.

In 1918, after the end of World War I, she moved to the Residence for Young Women, Spain's first official center for promoting public university education for women, established three years prior. Martín began studying at the University of Madrid, the only woman in the Department of Physical Sciences. She earned a degree in physics in 1922.

=== Crystallography research ===
After graduating, she began conducting research on crystallography at the Laboratory of Physical Research headed by the Aragonese physicist Julio Palacios at the university. The lab was sponsored by the Board for the Extension of Studies (JAE), predecessor to the Spanish National Research Council. She received a grant to support her research during her stay at the Residence from 1924 to 1926.

As a doctoral student, Martín was the first to characterize the crystal structure of nickel oxide, cobalt oxide, and lead(II) sulfide using the technique of x-ray diffraction. Her research built on the 1917 work of Albert W. Hull on their elemental forms. Martín published her doctoral thesis on the subject in 1926, becoming the first Spanish woman to earn a doctorate in physics. She also published the first article on crystallography in Spain. Her research was influential in the improvement of electric battery technology. It was also used by the ceramic industry.

== Career ==
=== Teaching in the United States ===
While studying at the University of Madrid, she taught at the Instituto-Escuela, an education center affiliated with JAE in Madrid, for financial support and received a teaching degree. At the Instituto-Escuela, she made between 124 and 175 pesetas each month. After completing her doctorate, Martín received a scholarship from JAE in 1926 to live and work in the United States for two years.

She taught Spanish language and physics at Connecticut College in the winter of 1926. She also visited the laboratories at Harvard University, Wellesley College, and Yale University in April of the following year to familiarize herself with contemporary advances in physics. Martín began teaching Spanish at Middlebury College in Vermont in the summer of 1927 with other women from the Residencia in Madrid.

=== University of Cambridge ===
After returning to Spain in 1929, Martín prepared for the entrance examinations for the meteorological service and joined as an assistant, becoming the only woman in the service for half a decade. Although she paused her research on crystallography in the interim years, Palacios supported her in joining Blas Cabrera's newly established Blas Cabrera Institute of Physical Chemistry in Madrid, where she continued her work on x-ray crystal structure analysis.

In 1932, she received a grant from the JAE to travel to the University of Cambridge as a visiting researcher for ten months. She attended Ernest Rutherford's physics lectures and was also influenced by C. T. R. Wilson, who specialized in atmospheric electricity and its early applications in aeronautics. She also worked with Wilson on sounding systems. Her request for an extension to the scholarship was denied, and she was forced to return to Spain.

=== Meteorological career ===
In 1933, after returning from Cambridge, Martín became the first woman to join the State Meteorological Agency as a member of the staff. However, after the outbreak of the Spanish Civil War caused the Republican government to relocate her Republican side of the agency to Valencia, she was dismissed in 1936 after refusing to leave Madrid. During the war, meteorological observatories became centers for communication and were entrusted to the Air Force. As a civilian, Martín was appointed acting director of the Igueldo Observatory in San Sebastián in 1937, where she headed the study of galernas, large storms in the Bay of Biscay, until 1940. There, she also befriended the Basque mathematician Carlos Santamaría Ansa. Some years later, when the Nationalist victory saw a scarcity of scientists in Madrid, she was reinstated after being vetted of Republican connections and subjected to an investigation, including of her close relationship with her brother in law, the exiled playwright Alejandro Casona. Martín was the only woman in the science department of the agency until 1960.

Martín continued studying atmospheric electricity at the State Meteorological Agency until her retirement. She published widely on the subject from 1943 to 1954. She was president of the Spanish Meteorological Association in 1973 and 1974, the first and only woman to hold the position until 2019.

In 1969, she attended the first conference of the Spanish Association of Meteorologists. Martín was a fellow of the Royal Spanish Mathematical Society, the Spanish Association for the Progress of Science, and the Spanish Royal Society of Physics and Chemistry.

She died in Madrid on 29 October 1979, aged 81. A service was held at the Church of San Pedro in Seville.

== Legacy ==
Martín is remembered principally for being the first woman in Spain to attain a doctorate in physics and to become a meteorologist. In 2017, a road in her home city of San Sebastián was named Avenida Felisa Martin Bravo after her.

== Personal life ==
Martín reported speaking French, English, Italian, and German in an application to JAE as a doctoral student.

While visiting the University of Cambridge in 1932, she met José Vallejo Sánchez, a Basque professor of Latin philology at the University of Seville. The two later married.
