= Piedad de la Cierva =

Spanish chemist and optics researcher (1913–2007)

- Born: Piedad de la Cierva Viudes; 1 June 1913; Murcia, Spain
- Died: 31 December 2007 (aged 94); Madrid, Spain
- Education: University of Valencia; Central University of Madrid
- Known for: Research on X-ray diffraction, antireflective coatings, optical glass, and refractory materials
- Scientific career
- Fields: Chemistry, optics
- Workplaces: Instituto Nacional de Física y Química; Spanish National Research Council; Laboratorio y Taller de Investigación del Estado Mayor de la Armada
- Doctoral advisor: Julio Palacios

Piedad de la Cierva Viudes (1 June 1913 – 31 December 2007) was a Spanish chemist whose research encompassed X-ray crystallography, artificial radioactivity, optics, and industrial materials. Trained during the Second Spanish Republic, she worked in the X-ray section of the Instituto Nacional de Física y Química and studied at the Institute for Theoretical Physics in Copenhagen. After the Spanish Civil War, she joined research organizations created or reorganized under the Franco regime. Her later work included antireflective coatings for optical instruments, the experimental production of optical glass in Spain, and insulating refractory materials made from rice-husk ash.

== Early life and education ==
De la Cierva was born in Murcia on 1 June 1913. She was the eldest of five children and the only daughter of Juan de la Cierva López, a lawyer and professor of law at the University of Murcia. Her extended family belonged to Murcia's political and economic elite. She was a great-niece of politician Juan de la Cierva y Peñafiel and a cousin of autogyro inventor Juan de la Cierva.

She began university study in the Faculty of Sciences at the University of Murcia in 1928 and transferred to the University of Valencia the following year. In 1932, aged nineteen, she completed a degree in chemical sciences with an extraordinary degree prize. She also qualified as a primary-school teacher, a credential her father had asked her to obtain alongside her science studies.

De la Cierva then moved to Madrid to undertake doctoral research under physicist Julio Palacios at the Instituto Nacional de Física y Química, commonly called the Rockefeller Institute after the foundation that helped fund it. Her thesis, Los factores atómicos del azufre y del plomo (The atomic factors of sulfur and lead), concerned the use of X-ray diffraction to study crystal structures. She published seven papers in the Anales de la Sociedad Española de Física y Química between 1933 and 1936, alone and with collaborators including Palacios, José Losada, and Luis Rivoir.

== Research before and during the Civil War ==
In 1935, a fellowship from the Royal Academy of Sciences' Marqués de Cartagena foundation took de la Cierva to the Institute for Theoretical Physics in Copenhagen. In George de Hevesy's laboratory she studied the artificial transmutation of aluminium by fast neutrons and became acquainted with new radioactivity techniques. During her return journey she visited other European laboratories, including Lise Meitner's laboratory at the Kaiser Wilhelm Institute for Chemistry in Berlin. Her work in Copenhagen led to papers on the transmutation of aluminium and neutron emission from minerals.

She returned to Madrid intending to establish an artificial-radioactivity program, but the outbreak of the Spanish Civil War in July 1936 interrupted that work. During part of the war she taught physics and chemistry at a secondary school in Osuna.

== Career under the Franco regime ==
After the war, the new regime dissolved the institutions of the Junta para Ampliación de Estudios and incorporated much of their infrastructure into the newly created Spanish National Research Council (CSIC). The Instituto Nacional de Física y Química was reorganized as the Instituto Alonso de Santa Cruz de Física. De la Cierva joined its optics section, which became the nucleus of the Instituto de Óptica Daza de Valdés in 1946. Historians have described her career as an example of both institutional rupture and scientific continuity across the war. They also note that her expertise, her family's proximity to political elites, and the support of naval engineer and physicist José María Otero de Navascués helped her retain a place in institutions that otherwise restricted women's advancement.

De la Cierva also taught atomic and molecular structure and spectroscopy in doctoral courses at the Central University of Madrid. In 1941 she and chemist María Teresa Salazar competed with three men for university chairs in physical chemistry. The chairs in Valencia and Seville went to male candidates and the Murcia chair was left vacant. Contemporary records examined by historians show that the two women's work was discounted and that officials had warned de la Cierva that faculties had agreed not to appoint a woman. She did not compete for a chair again.

Her optics research initially focused on aluminium mirrors made by vacuum evaporation and on antireflective films for lenses and prisms. By about 1945, her group had developed treatments based on vacuum-deposited fluoride layers and chemical treatment of glass for use on binoculars manufactured by the Navy's Laboratorio y Taller de Investigación del Estado Mayor de la Armada (LTIEMA). A report on the work received a first prize from the Royal Academy of Sciences in 1946.

In 1945 de la Cierva became civilian technical staff at LTIEMA, a military research laboratory established by the Navy the previous year. The laboratory's task was to develop prototypes that Spanish industry could manufacture, in keeping with the regime's policy of autarky and the Navy's interest in optical equipment. Otero de Navascués asked her in 1947 to organize an optical-glass laboratory. She travelled to the United States in 1948, working at the National Bureau of Standards in Washington, D.C., and visiting glass programs and manufacturers in Ohio and New York.

After returning to Spain in 1949, de la Cierva assembled a team that analyzed domestic raw materials, made refractory crucibles, and built furnaces. By 1950 the group had produced clear experimental glass, reducing its dependence on material imported from German manufacturers. The team's account, Ensayos de fabricación de vidrio óptico, received the Juan de la Cierva technical research prize and was published by the CSIC in 1955. The Navy ended the optical-glass program and dismantled its furnaces in 1957 after a change in LTIEMA's leadership and priorities.

== Later research and mentorship ==
De la Cierva subsequently investigated glass surfaces and the use of silica-rich rice-husk ash in insulating refractory blocks. Work by her group led to Spanish patents in 1964 and 1965 for a process for manufacturing insulating refractory blocks.

She trained and supervised younger researchers at LTIEMA. Research developed under her supervision formed the basis of doctoral theses by Francisca de Andrés on refractory clays, Luisa Arroyo on optical-glass surfaces, Antonia Muñoz Turnes on industrial uses of rice-husk ash, and Guadalupe Ortiz de Landázuri on insulating refractories. Because de la Cierva did not hold a university chair, male professors were listed as the formal supervisors of these theses.

De la Cierva joined Opus Dei as an associate member in 1952. She remained a civilian employee of the Navy until taking voluntary retirement in 1976. She died in Madrid on 31 December 2007, aged 94.

Historians of Spanish science have treated her trajectory as evidence that some women occupied consequential positions in scientific and military laboratories under Franco, while emphasizing that family status and trusted male patrons affected access to those positions. Her failed chair competition, employment classification, and inability to be formally credited for doctoral supervision also illustrate the institutional limits women continued to face.

== Selected works ==
- de la Cierva Viudes, Piedad; Palacios, Julio (1935). "Factores atómicos absolutos del azufre y del plomo". Anales de la Sociedad Española de Física y Química (in Spanish). 33: 34–38.
- de la Cierva Viudes, Piedad (1936). "Bifurcación en la transmutación del aluminio por la acción de los neutrones rápidos". Anales de la Sociedad Española de Física y Química (in Spanish). 33: 541–588.
- de la Cierva, Piedad (1943). "Láminas antirreflectoras". Anales de la Sociedad Española de Física y Química (in Spanish). 39: 136–141.
- de la Cierva Viudes, Piedad (1955). Ensayos de fabricación de vidrio óptico (in Spanish). Madrid: Consejo Superior de Investigaciones Científicas.
