= Edward Wichers =

US chemist (1892-1984)

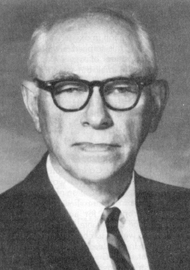
- Born: March 25, 1892; Zeeland, Michigan
- Died: January 1984 (aged 91); Montgomery, Maryland
- Education: Hope College
- Known for: Determination of atomic weights
- Scientific career
- Fields: Physical chemistry
- Workplaces: National Bureau of Standards

Edward Wichers (March 25, 1892 – January 1984) was an American chemist and Associate Director of the National Bureau of Standards from 1958-62. He is notable for his work on atomic weights of the elements.

Edward Wichers graduated from Hope College in 1913 and from 1948 to 1958 Wichers headed the Chemistry Division at the National Bureau of Standards. In 1941 he was awarded the Honorary Doctor of Science degree at Hope College commencement. Wichers was assigned to the Manhattan Project at Los Alamos to work on the first atomic bomb, 1944-1945. He headed the International Atomic Weights Commission from 1950–59 and from 1964–69, and was the President of the IUPAC's Inorganic Chemistry Division from 1955-1957.
