= Julio Palacios =

Julio Palacios may refer to:

- Julio Palacios (footballer)
- Julio Palacios (physicist)
