= Gregory P. Baxter =

American chemist

Gregory Paul Baxter
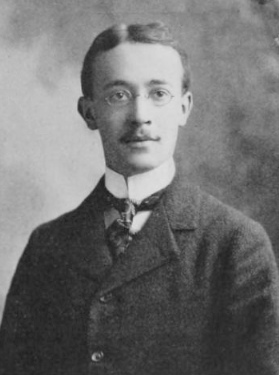
- Born: March 3, 1876; Somerville, Massachusetts
- Died: February 10, 1953 (aged 76); Cambridge, Massachusetts
- Citizenship: USA
- Education: Harvard College
- Known for: Determination of atomic weights
- Scientific career
- Fields: Analytical chemistry

Gregory Paul Baxter (March 3, 1876 – February 10, 1953) was an American chemist notable for his work on atomic weights.

== Biography ==
Born in Somerville, Massachusetts, Baxter became an instructor in chemistry at Harvard in 1897. Baxter served as chairman of the Harvard Chemistry Department from 1911 to 1932. In 1925 he assumed the Theodore William Richards Professorship, which he held until his retirement in 1944.

A specialist in the study of atomic weights and other chemical constants, Baxter served as chairman of the International Committee on Atomic Weights from 1930 to 1949. During the war he was associated with the Office of Scientific Research and Development. Baxter was a member of the American Academy of Arts and Sciences, the National Academy of Sciences.

He died at his home in Cambridge, Massachusetts on February 10, 1953.
