= IUPAC Inorganic Chemistry Division =

The Inorganic Chemistry Division of the International Union of Pure and Applied Chemistry (IUPAC), also known as Division II, deals with all aspects of inorganic chemistry, including materials and bioinorganic chemistry, and also with isotopes, atomic weights and the periodic table. It furthermore advises the Chemical Nomenclature and Structure Representation Division (Division VIII) on issues dealing with inorganic compounds and materials. For the general public, the most visible result of the division's work is that it evaluates and advises the IUPAC on names and symbols proposed for new elements that have been approved for addition to the periodic table. For the scientific end educational community the work on isotopic abundances and atomic weights is of fundamental importance as these numbers are continuously checked and updated.

== Subcommittees ==
The division has the following subcommittees and commissions:

- Subcommittee on Isotopic Abundance Measurements
- Interdivisional Subcommittee on Materials Chemistry
- Subcommittee on Stable Isotope Reference Material Assessment
- Commission on Isotopic Abundances and Atomic Weights (CIAAW)

== Running Projects ==
List of Running Projects of IUPAC Division II

- Recommendations for Isotope Data in Geosciences
- Priority claims for the discovery of elements with atomic number greater than 111
- Evaluation of Isotopic Abundance Variations in Selected Heavier Elements
- Evaluated Compilation of International Reference Materials for Isotope Abundance Measurements
- Development of an Isotopic Periodic Table for the Educational Community
- Towards a comprehensive definition of oxidation state
- Coordination polymers and metal organic frameworks: nomenclature guidelines
- Evaluation of Radiogenic Abundance Variations in Selected Elements
- Technical Guidelines for Isotope Abundances and Atomic Weight Measurements
- Assessment of Stable Isotopic Reference and Inter-Comparison Materials
- Online evaluated isotope ratio database for use communities (2011-2014)
- Evaluated Published Isotope Ratio Data (2010- 2011)
- Guidelines for Measurement of Luminescence Spectra and Quantum Yields of Inorganic Compounds, Metal Complexes and Materials
- Terminology and definition of quantities related to the isotope distribution in elements with more than two stable isotopes
- Evaluated published isotope ratio data (2011- 2013)
- Evaluation of published lead isotopic data (1950- 2013) for a new standard atomic weight of lead
- Development a procedure for using intervals instead of fixed values for atomic weights: an educational exercise

== Former projects and other notable activities ==
The Inorganic Chemistry Division was a partner in the 2011 Global Chemistry Experiment “Water: A Chemical Solution” that took part during the International Year of Chemistry.

== Notable former division members ==
- Mary L. Good former president
- Norman Greenwood former president
- Edward Wichers president 1955–1957

== See also ==
- Chemical nomenclature
- Commission on Isotopic Abundances and Atomic Weights
