= Norman Greenwood =

Australian chemist (1925–2012)

Norman Neill Greenwood
- Born: 19 January 1925; Melbourne, Australia
- Died: 14 November 2012 (aged 87); Leeds, United Kingdom
- Education: University of Melbourne; Sidney Sussex College, Cambridge
- Known for: Boron chemistry Determination of atomic weights The textbook Chemistry of the Elements
- Scientific career
- Fields: Inorganic chemistry
- Workplaces: University of Newcastle upon Tyne; University of Leeds
- Doctoral advisor: Harry Julius Emeléus
- Notable students: Kenneth Wade

Norman Neill Greenwood (19 January 1925 – 14 November 2012) was an Australian-British chemist and Emeritus Professor at the University of Leeds. Together with Alan Earnshaw, he wrote the textbook Chemistry of the Elements, first published in 1984.

== Early life and education ==
After attending University High School, Melbourne (1939–42), Greenwood read Chemistry at the University of Melbourne and graduated with a BSc in 1945 and an MSc in 1948. In 1948, he was awarded the Exhibition of 1851 Scholarship to enable him to read for a PhD at Sidney Sussex College, Cambridge under the supervision of Harry Julius Emeléus. He received the PhD in 1951.

== Academic career ==
Greenwood was a senior research fellow at the Atomic Energy Research Establishment from 1951 until 1953 when he was appointed a lecturer at the University of Nottingham. His first PhD student at Nottingham was Kenneth Wade (1954–1957).

Professor William Wynne-Jones, who was the Chairman of the School of Chemistry at Kings College, Durham (which was to become the University of Newcastle upon Tyne in 1963), recruited Greenwood to the first established chair of inorganic chemistry in the country in 1961.

Greenwood was appointed Professor and Head of the Department of Inorganic and Structural Chemistry at the University of Leeds in 1971, a post which he held until his retirement in 1990 when he was given the title Emeritus Professor.

His researches in inorganic and structural chemistry have made major advances in the chemistry of boron hydrides and other main-group element compounds. He also pioneered the application of Mössbauer spectroscopy to problems in chemistry. He was a prolific writer and inspirational lecturer on chemical and educational themes, and has held numerous visiting professorships throughout the world. He was appointed by NASA as principal investigator in the study of lunar rocks. He served as chairman of the IUPAC Commission on Atomic Weights from 1970 to 1975 and also as president of the IUPAC Inorganic Chemistry Division.

== Honours ==
Greenwood was elected a Fellow of the Royal Society (FRS) in 1987.

== Works ==
- Greenwood, N.N. (1968). Principles of Atomic Orbitals – Monograph for Teachers. Royal Society of Chemistry. p. 48. ISBN 978-0-85404-028-5.
- Greenwood, N. N. (1968). Ionic crystals, lattice defects and nonstoichiometry. London: Butterworths. ISBN 0-408-56001-0. OCLC 32067.
- Greenwood, N. N.; Gibb, T. C. (1971). Mössbauer Spectroscopy. Dordrecht: Springer Netherlands. doi:10.1007/978-94-009-5697-1. ISBN 978-94-009-5699-5.
- Greenwood, Norman N.; Earnshaw, Alan (1997). Chemistry of the Elements (2nd ed.). Butterworth-Heinemann. p. 1340. doi:10.1016/C2009-0-30414-6. ISBN 978-0-08-037941-8.
- Greenwood, N.N. (2012). Recollections of a Scientist Volume 1. Boyhood and Youth in Australia. Xlibris Corporation. p. 288. ISBN 978-1-4691-7935-3. (self-published)
- Greenwood, N.N. (2012). Recollections of a Scientist, Volume 2: Expanding Horizons: England and Europe (1948–51). Xlibris Corporation. p. 438. ISBN 978-1-4771-5186-0. (self-published)

Editor: Spectroscopic Properties of Inorganic and Organometallic Compounds, Royal Society of Chemistry, Volume 1 (1968) to Volume 9 (1976)
