= Mary L. Good =

American inorganic chemist (1931–2019)

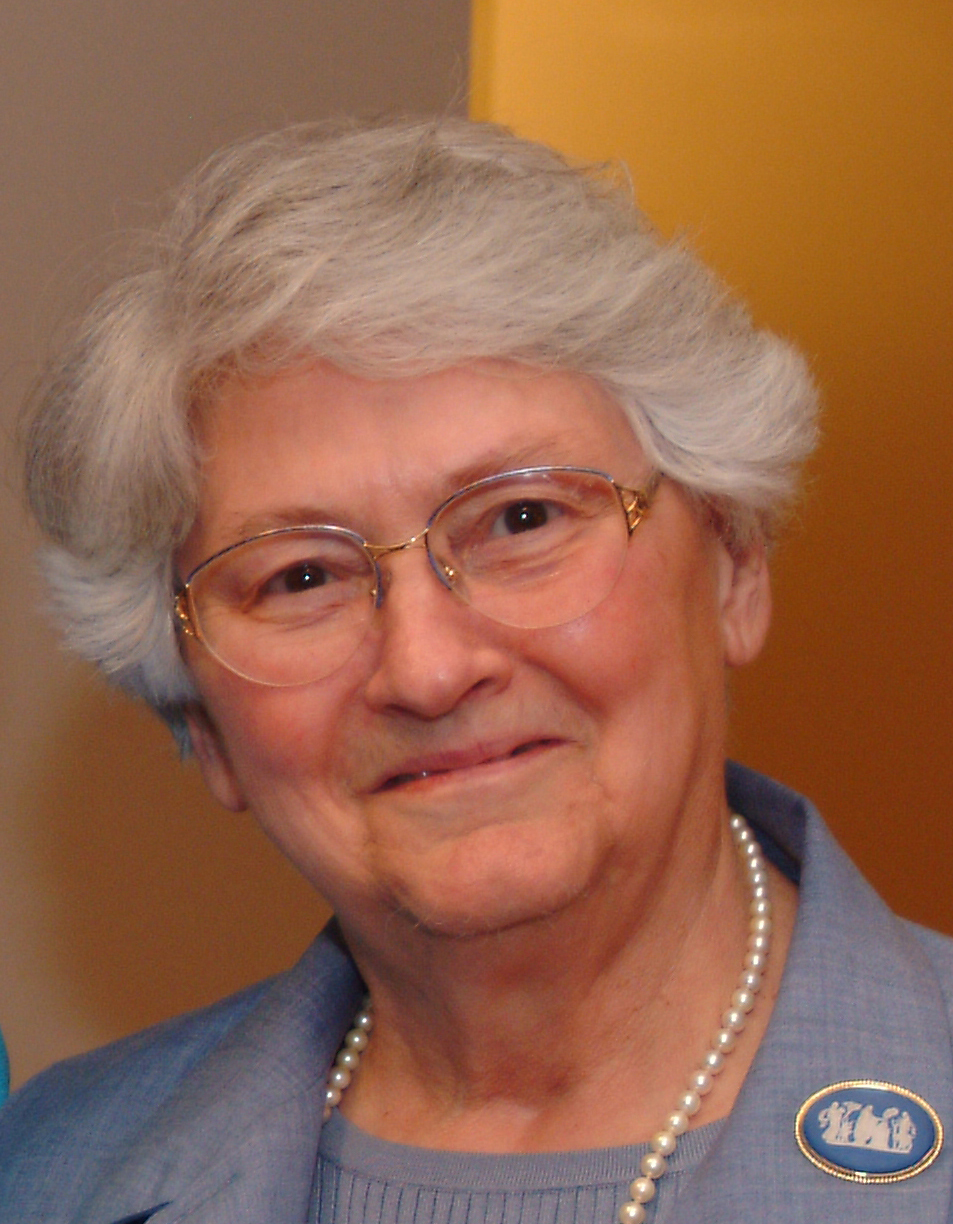

United States Secretary of Commerce
- Acting; April 3, 1996 – April 12, 1996
- President: Bill Clinton
- Preceded by: Ron Brown
- Succeeded by: Mickey Kantor

Under Secretary of Commerce for Technology
- In office 1993 – June 3, 1997
- President: Bill Clinton

Personal details
- Born: Mary Lowe; June 20, 1931 Grapevine, Texas, U.S.
- Died: November 20, 2019 (aged 88) Little Rock, Arkansas, U.S.
- Spouse: Bill Good (m. 1952)
- Children: 2
- Education: University of Central Arkansas (BS); University of Arkansas (MS, PhD)
- Awards: Garvan-Olin Medal (1973); Industrial Research Institute Medal (1991); Heinz Award for Technology, the Economy and Employment (2000); Vannevar Bush Award (2004)

Mary Lowe Good (June 20, 1931 – November 20, 2019) was an American inorganic chemist who worked academically, in industrial research and in government. Good contributed to the understanding of catalysts such as ruthenium.

Good served as the Under Secretary for Technology in the United States Department of Commerce from 1993 to 1997 under President Bill Clinton. She briefly served as Acting United States Secretary of Commerce from April 3, 1996, to April 12, 1996.

Good received a number of significant awards including the Garvan–Olin Medal, the Othmer Gold Medal, the Priestley Medal, the Vannevar Bush Award, and the Heinz Award in Technology, the Economy, and Employment.

== Early life and education ==
External videos
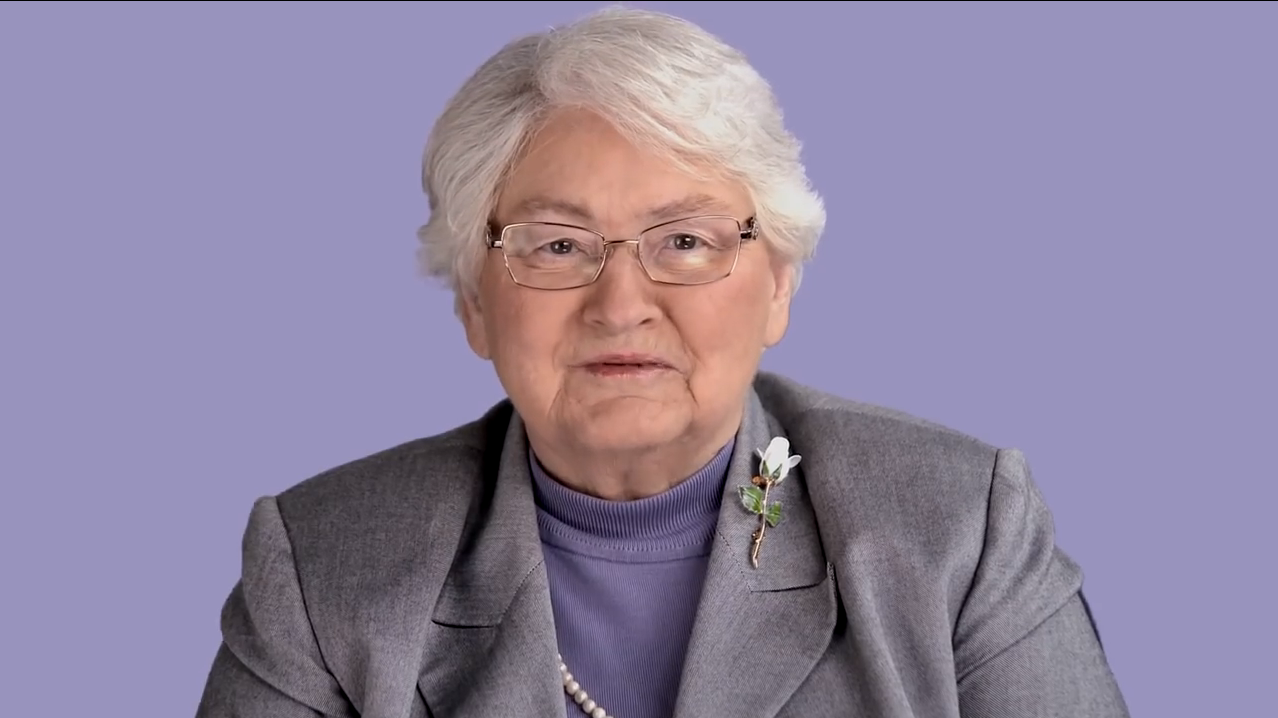
- Mary Lowe Good, "You've got to take the opportunities as they appear", Science History Institute
- Dr. Mary Good Interview, Arkansas Academy of Computing History

Mary Lowe was born on June 20, 1931, in Grapevine, Texas, to Winnie and John Lowe. The family moved to Kirby, Arkansas, in 1942. Her father was a principal in a local school, and her mother was a teacher and librarian. The family later moved to Willisville, Arkansas, where Mary attended high school. No chemistry course or lab was offered at the school, so Mary would spend her time as a young student creating her own labs. She once produced a homemade photography studio in the cellar of her home after fixing up an old enlarger and reading up on the chemicals needed for photo developing.

Lowe initially attended Arkansas State Teacher's College (now the University of Central Arkansas) with the intention of being a home economics teacher. She became interested in chemistry as a freshman and changed her major to chemistry and physics, receiving her B.Sc. from the University of Central Arkansas in 1950. Lowe became one of the first three students to graduate from the University's chemistry program.

Her professors encouraged her to go to graduate school. She received a fellowship, which enabled her to study radiochemistry with Raymond R. Edwards at the University of Arkansas. At age 19, as an atomic energy research assistant, she received her first Q-level government clearance. In 1952, she married Bill Jewel Good, a fellow graduate student in physics. Mary Lowe Good received her MS in 1953 and her PhD in 1955 from the University of Arkansas becoming the first woman from Arkansas to earn a doctoral degree in the hard sciences. Her graduate work involved studying radioactive iodine in aqueous solutions (used for treating thyroid conditions). She worked on processes of solvent extraction of metal complexes and described the chemical and physical properties of chemical species in an organic solvent. She was able to explain why solutions of radioactive iodine were unstable, and determine the concentration at which species would be at equilibrium values, by applying the Nernst equation effect.

== Louisiana State University System ==
Good spent 25 years in teaching and research at Louisiana State University and the University of New Orleans, which was at the time part of the Louisiana State University System. Good went to Baton Rouge as director of the radiochemistry laboratory and as an instructor and assistant professor of chemistry (1954–1958). At Baton Rouge she worked on iodine and sulfur chemistry with Sean McGlynn.

In 1958 Good and her husband moved to New Orleans when both were offered positions at a new campus that was being established. The Louisiana State University New Orleans (LSUNO) was the first university in the southern states to open as a fully integrated institution. Expanding on her work in radiochemistry, Good became interested in using spectroscopy to study inorganic chemistry compounds, taking measurements and relating experimental results to theoretical predictions. She was able to study molecular bonding in both solutions and solid states. She also was able to extract rhodium complexes, using organic solvents, and demonstrate that they were bimetallic.

Good moved up the academic ranks to become the Boyd Professor of Chemistry at New Orleans (1974–1978), the first woman to achieve the university's most distinguished rank. From 1978 to 1980, she returned to Baton Rouge to develop a new program as the Boyd Professor of Materials Science, Division of Engineering Research.

Good was one of the first people to use Mössbauer spectroscopy techniques for basic chemical research. Mössbauer spectroscopy enables researchers to study the interactions of gamma rays with matter, observing very small differences in the energy of electrons within atoms. This data can be used to identify the molecular structure of complicated compounds containing metal ions.

Good contributed to the understanding of catalysts such as ruthenium. At that time, no one had attempted to observe Mössbauer effects in ruthenium, in part because it had to be examined at extremely low temperatures, cooled by liquid helium. Good was able to study ruthenium, which exists in a variety of oxidation states, and derive detailed chemical and structural information.

She also did work in materials science on the physical and biological investigations of marine antifouling coatings, used to remove barnacles from ships. Her publications include more than 100 articles in refereed journals and several books.

== American Chemical Society ==
Good was the first woman to be elected to the board of the American Chemical Society in 1972. She was elected ACS Board Chairman in 1978 and 1980, and became ACS President elect as of 1986, serving as president in 1987.

== International Union of Pure and Applied Chemistry ==
Good was also elected President of the inorganic chemistry division of the International Union of Pure and Applied Chemistry (IUPAC) in 1981, and held the position until 1985, for two terms. She was the first woman to be elected a division head of IUPAC.

As head of the inorganic chemistry division, she was responsible for overseeing the work of the commissions on nomenclature for inorganic chemistry; the Commission on Isotopic Abundances and Atomic Weights, and the commission on high temperatures and refractory materials. Her work included supervising a complete revision of the IUPAC nomenclature of inorganic chemistry or "Red Book".

In addition to holding the position of division president (1980–1985), Good served on IUPAC's Governing Bureau (1985–1993). She became an elected member (EM) of the bureau after her second term as division president, and served on the Executive Committee (EC) of IUPAC from 1985 to 1993. In 1989, Good was instrumental in introducing the "Chemistry in Action" program, encouraging IUPAC members to become active and visible leaders in areas of scientific and social importance, including the atmosphere and the environment, energy processes, advanced materials, and bio-technology.

Good also served on the board of directors of the Industrial Research Institute (IRI, 1982-1987).

== Industrial career ==
In 1980, Mary Lowe Good was approached to become head of the Engineered Materials Research division at Signal Research Center, Inc. (previously Universal Oil Products, later Allied-Signal Inc.), with a staff of 400 scientists and technicians and annual sales of approximately $3 billion. In 1981 Mary Good was chosen as vice-president and director of research. She headed the Research Center during a period of significant changes (ownership, mergers, acquisitions and divestitures), maintaining a focus on new technology development and its licensing and commercialization. She became president and director of research for Signal Research Center in 1985, and president of Allied-Signal Engineered Materials Research in 1986 and then the senior vice-president of technology, coordinating the activities of three research centers.

== Government service ==
Mary Lowe Good held government positions under the administrations of four presidents: Jimmy Carter, Ronald Reagan, George H. W. Bush, and Bill Clinton.

In 1980 she was appointed to the National Science Board of the National Science Foundation by Jimmy Carter. In 1986 she was appointed to it again by Ronald Reagan. From 1988 to 1991, she was the first woman to chair the board. In 1991 President Bush appointed her to the President's Council of Advisors on Science and Technology (PCAST). All three positions were part-time commitments, held during the period in which she worked at Allied-Signal Inc.

In 1993, Good left Allied Signal to take a four-year full-time position as the Under Secretary of Commerce for Technology in the Technology Administration, under the Clinton Administration. During this time Good led the Clean Car Initiative to develop a hybrid gas-electric car. She encouraged the government to fund basic research and emerging technologies. Good was appointed Acting United States Secretary of Commerce on April 3, 1996, following the death of Ronald H. Brown, until Mickey Kantor was appointed 9 days later by Bill Clinton.

== University of Arkansas at Little Rock ==
In 1997 Good became the Donaghey University Professor at the University of Arkansas at Little Rock. She also became the founding dean of the George W. Donaghey College of Engineering and Information Technology (EIT). She retired July 1, 2011, becoming dean emeritus of the College of Engineering and Information Technology at the University of Arkansas-Little Rock and special advisor to the chancellor for economic development.

== Other activities ==
In 1976 Mary Lowe Good was initiated into the Beta Phi chapter of Alpha Chi Sigma at the South Dakota School of Mines.

She was member for Fund for Arkansas, LLC and Stage 1 Diagnostics, and served on the boards of Delta Trust & Bank and St. Vincent Infirmary, Biogen Idec, IDEXX Laboratories, Cincinnati Milacron, Ameritech, Acxiom Corporation.

From 1988 to 1993 Mary L. Good was president of Zonta International Foundation, an organization supporting the involvement of women in business and science, and the improvement internationally of their legal, political, economic, educational and health status.

Good was the founding Chairman of ASTRA, the Alliance for Science & Technology Research in America, beginning in 2000. She was a strong proponent of STEM education and a supporter of women in technology, and was recognized as a national leader in this area.

The American Association for the Advancement of Science (AAAS) elected Good to serve as the president in 2001.

== Death ==
Good died at her home in Little Rock, Arkansas, on November 20, 2019, at the age of 88.

== Awards ==
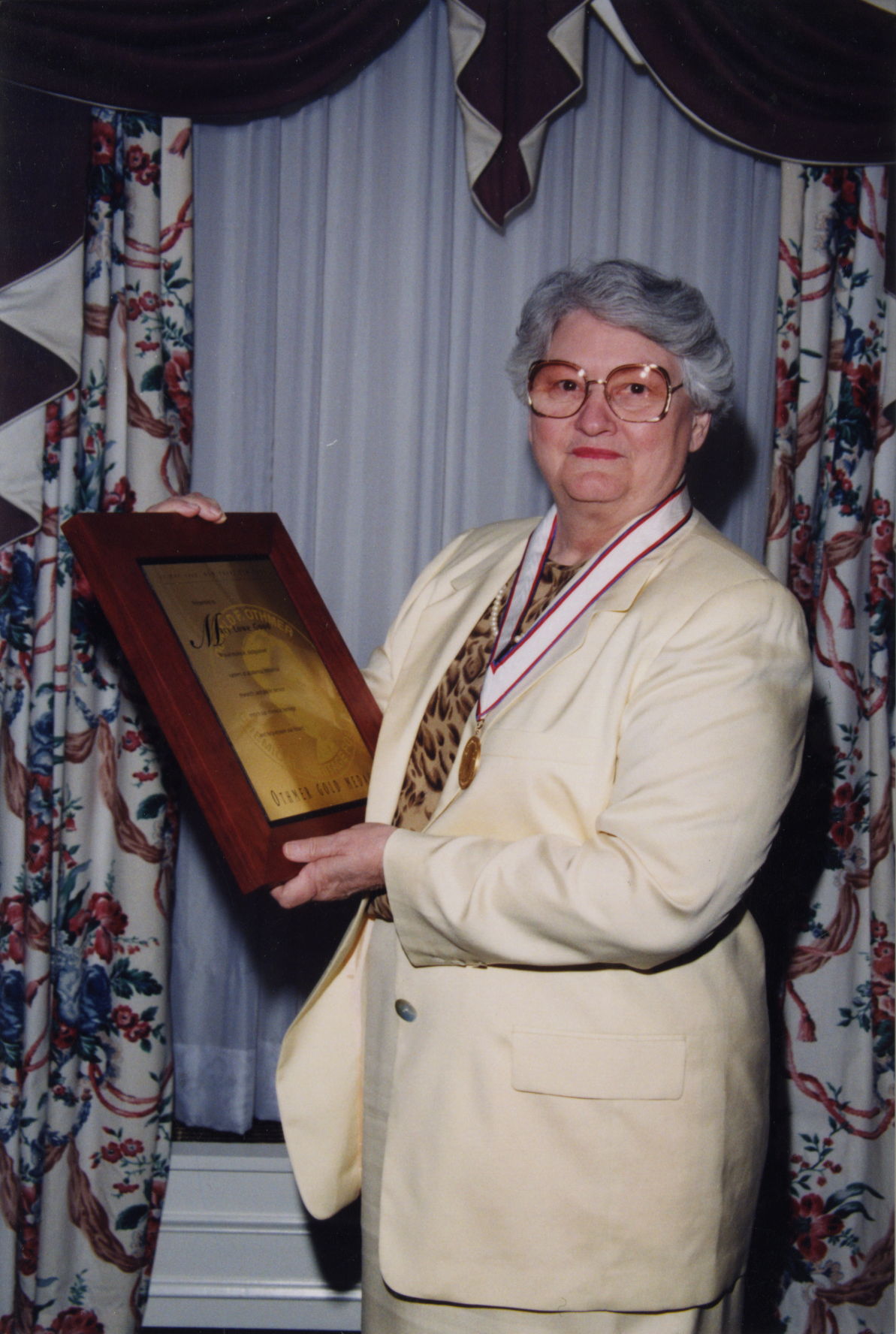
Mary Lowe Good with the Othmer Gold Medal, 1998

- 1969 Agnes Fay Morgan Research Award
- 1973 Garvan-Olin Medal
- 1982 Scientist of the Year, Industrial Research and Development Magazine
- 1983 American Institute of Chemists Gold Medal
- 1987 Member of the National Academy of Engineering for both materials and chemical engineering
- 1988 The Delmer S. Fahrney Medal of the Franklin Institute
- 1991 Charles Lathrop Parsons Award for Public Service, first woman recipient, from the American Chemical Society
- 1991 IRI Medal from the Industrial Research Institute, first woman recipient
- 1994 Member of the Royal Society of Chemistry
- 1996 Glenn T. Seaborg Medal, first woman recipient
- 1997 Priestley Medal, first woman recipient
- 1998 AAAS Philip Hauge Abelson Prize, first woman recipient
- 1998 Othmer Gold Medal
- 1999 Member of the American Academy of Arts and Sciences
- 2000 Member of the American Philosophical Society
- 2000 The 6th Annual Heinz Award in Technology, the Economy and Employment
- 2002 Alpha Chi Sigma Hall of Fame
- 2004 Vannevar Bush Award, the National Science Foundation's highest honor

"For her achievements as an educator and industrial research manager. An extraordinary statesperson, a distinguished public servant, and a remarkable scientist, she has contributed broadly to the understanding and promotion of the value of science and technology."
