= Frank Wigglesworth Clarke =

American scientist and chemist (1847–1931)

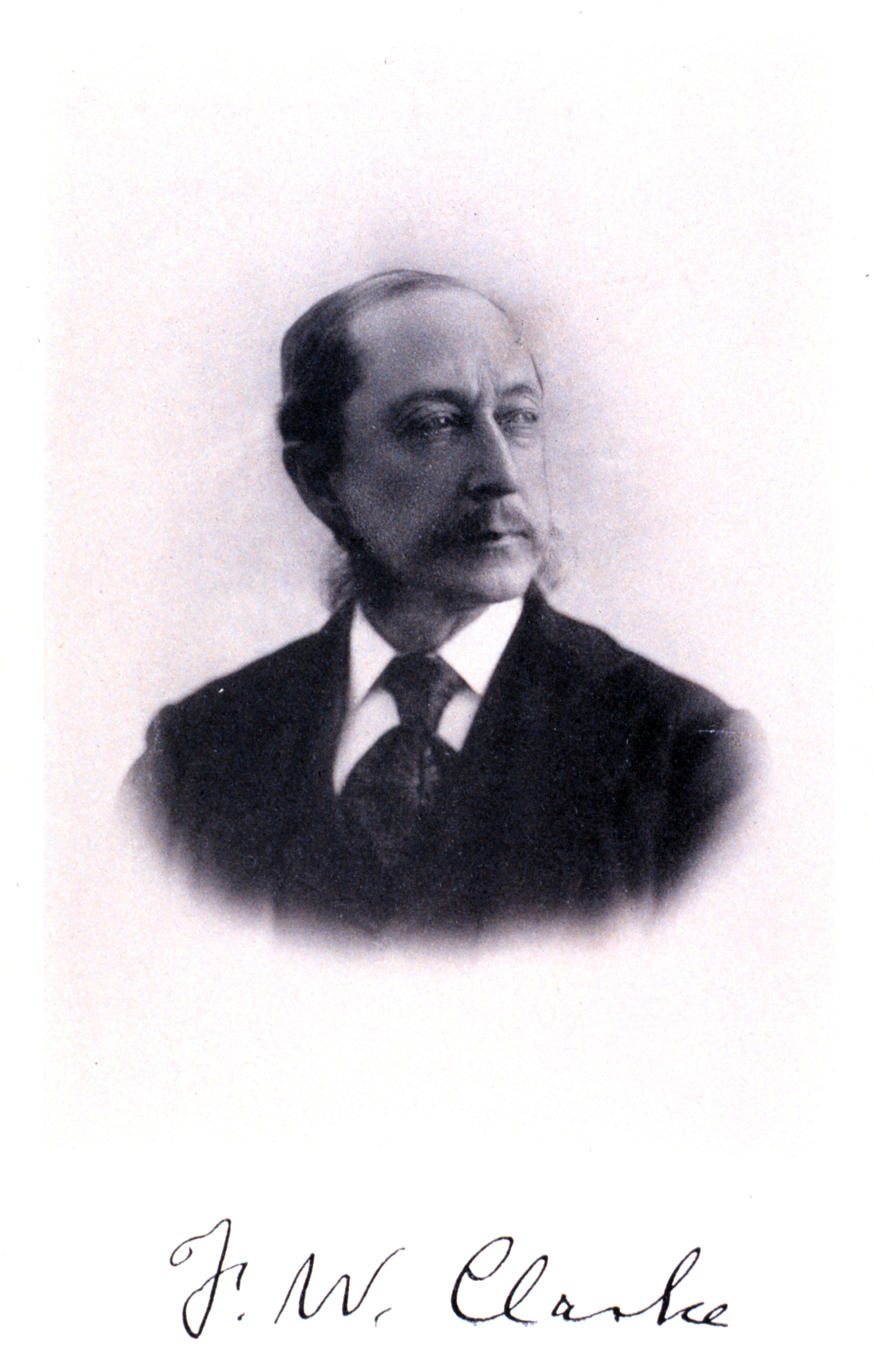
- Born: March 19, 1847; Boston, Massachusetts, US
- Died: May 23, 1931 (aged 84); Chevy Chase, Maryland, US
- Education: Lawrence Scientific School, Harvard Colleges (B.Sc.)
- Known for: Creation of the American Chemical Society; Atomic weights
- Spouse: Mary P. Olmsted
- Scientific career
- Fields: Geochemistry
- Workplaces: University of Cincinnati; United States Geological Survey

Signature
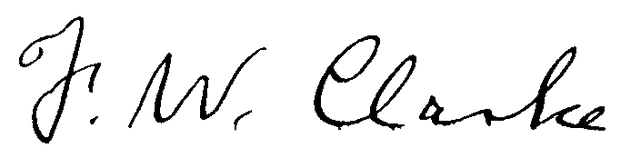

Frank Wigglesworth Clarke (March 19, 1847 – May 23, 1931) of Boston, Massachusetts, and Washington, D.C. was an American scientist and chemist. Sometimes known as the "Father of Geochemistry," Clarke is credited with determining the composition of the Earth's crust. He was a founder of The American Chemical Society and served as its President, in 1901.

== Expertise ==
Clarke was the first theorist to advance a hypothesis regarding the evolution of elements. This concept emerged early in his intellectual career. His "Evolution and the Spectroscope" (1873) appeared in Popular Science Monthly. It noted a parallel evolution of minerals, accompanying that of plant life.

He was known for pushing mineral analysis beyond analytical results. He sought compilations of the associations, alterations, and syntheses of each mineral sample. His study "Constants of Nature" (Smithsonian Institution 1876) was one of the first collections of both physical and chemical constants. The USGS's Atomic Weights series became standard references for the chemistry and geochemistry professions and academic fields. Clarke was also an academic collaborator. His Data on Geochemistry became a means of collecting peer professional efforts for common use across five successive editions.

Beginning with his Constitution of silicates (1895), Clarke advanced a methodology of geochemical analysis which described a mineral's composition through fact coordination. Priority was placed on contextualizing the research by describing constitution, structure and relationship with other minerals. The mineral sample's natural history was the end goal, a means of articulating the mineral's alteration products and pseudomorphs as a record of chemical change. To this record Clarke added the artificial history record available in the laboratory. The natural and artificial histories, combined, created what Clarke called the "constitution of a mineral." The constitution of a mineral was best summarized by, in the words of Clarke, "a good formula" which " . . . indicates the convergence of knowledge; if it fulfills that purpose it is useful, even though it may be supplanted at some later day by an expression of still greater generality."

Clarke authored one of the first governmental reports on the teaching of science in the United States. The report was sponsored by the US Commissioner of Education in 1878 and titled: "Report on the teaching of chemistry and physics in the United States". It was printed by the Government Printing Office in Washington, DC. Clarke's stated purpose in writing the report was to "state the facts, and secondly, to point out defects and remedies--to show on the one hand what is, and on the other what ought to be" relative to the teaching of chemistry and physics in the United States. The report was exhaustive, spanning secondary institutions, normal schools, and more than 350 colleges and universities.

In 1908 the first edition of Clarke's work, The Data of Geochemistry (Survey Bulletin no. 330), was published while he was the Chief Chemist at the U.S. Geological Survey. Clarke's fifth edition of this bulletin was released in 1924; the year he retired. Clarke was also an early pioneer (1891) of work efficiency studies, using the theory of probability and least squares as the basis for work review.

== Early life and education ==
Clarke's parents, Henry W. Clarke and Abby (Fisher) Clarke, were residents of Boston, Massachusetts. Henry W. Clarke was a hardware merchant and dealer in iron-working machinery. Abby Clarke died when Frank Clarke was an infant of ten days. Among Clarke's New England ties were his grandfather Samuel Clarke, who served as a Unitarian minister at Princeton, New Jersey and Uxbridge, Massachusetts. Clarke was also a descendant of Col. Edward Wigglesworth, who served under General George Washington in the Continental Army, and Michael Wigglesworth, an 18th-century Puritan poet who wrote "Day of Doom". Frank Clarke was raised by his Unitarian grandfather, Samuel Clarke, at Uxbridge until 1851.

In 1851, his father Henry W. Clarke remarried, and the new family constituted itself at Woburn, Massachusetts until 1858. The Clarkes lived at Worcester, Massachusetts from 1859–1866, when they returned to Boston. After Frank left for collegiate studies, Henry Clarke moved to Watertown where he resided until his death in 1907.

Clarke's primary education occurred in Woburn and Uxbridge, Massachusetts; his secondary schooling was gained at a boarding school in Stoughton and several schools in Boston. He attended Boston Latin School and the English High School before matriculating to Harvard College's Lawrence Scientific School in March 1865. His Harvard mentor was Wolcott Gibbs. Clarke took his Bachelor of Science from Harvard in 1867.

He then took a position as a chemistry lecturer at Boston Dental College. He then served as a Chemistry instructor under hydrocarbon scientist and fellow Lawrence School graduate, James Mason Crafts at the young Cornell University. Often stereotyped as a "chemist," the record shows Clarke to also have been a geologist. His short sojourn in Ithaca, New York prompted extensive surveys of local geologic forms, resumed when he taught at the University of Cincinnati. Clarke returned to Boston after the AY 1868-1869, and resumed lectures at the Boston Dental College and pursued literary and journalistic endeavors, including reporting for the Boston Advertiser, through 1873.

== Public Service ==
Clarke retired from the public service on January 1, 1925, having served as the Chief Chemist of the U.S. Geological Survey since 1883. Part of his Survey work included analysis of the Yellowstone geysers and their water. He also supported American contributions to many exhibitions, most notably the 1900 Paris Exposition. At the centennial of John Dalton's atomic theory held at Manchester, England in 1903, Clarke delivered the Wilde Lecture. Returning to England in 1909, he presented before The Chemical Society on the subject of his mentor, Wolcott Gibbs. His forty-two year career included parallel service with the United States National Museum as 'honorary curator' of minerals. The Smithsonian Institution's extensive mineral collection "are due in large measure to his active interest and his painstaking efforts both in the collection and exhibition of specimens." From 1892 to 1902, Clarke was the lone member of the American Chemical Society's Committee on Atomic Weights. In 1902, the need for commonality between active American and German scientific committees prompted the formation of the International Commission on Atomic Weights, with Frank Clarke as its chairman. As chairman, Clarke guided the international committee in successive revisions of the Periodic Table of Elements which continued until interrupted by the First World War in 1918.

== Academic career ==
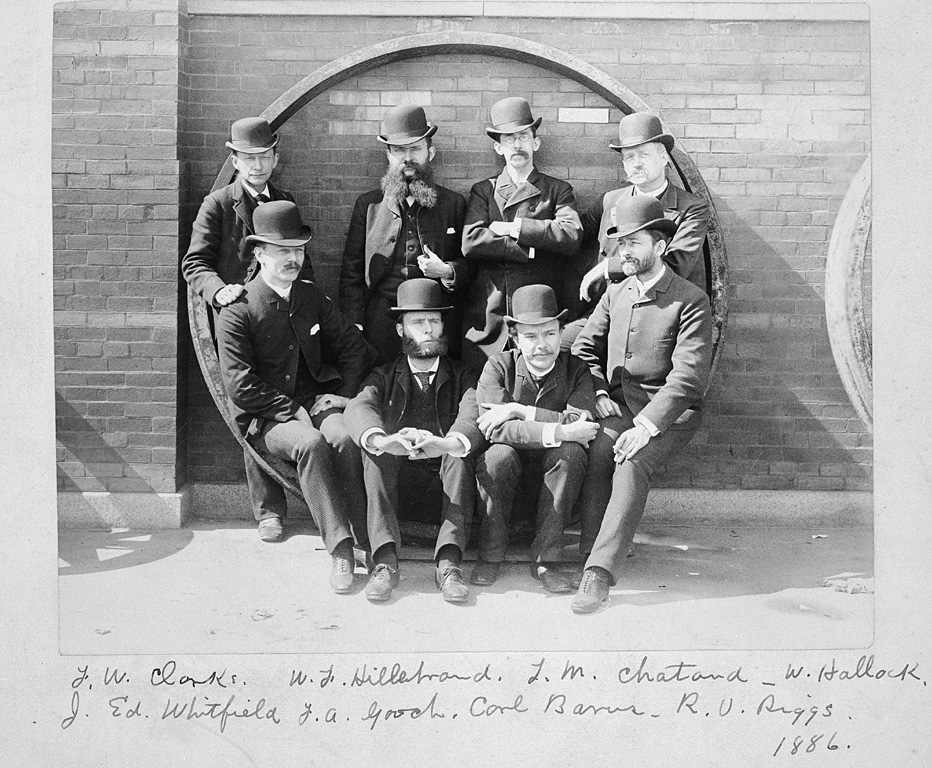
Frank Wigglesworth Clarke, back row, left, with colleagues

Prior to entering the federal service, Clarke taught chemistry and geochemistry at Howard University (1873–1874) and the University of Cincinnati (1874–1883). While at Cincinnati, he made extensive forays into Appalachia to study its geology and form. Clarke's first academic work was entitled On a new process in mineral analysis (March 1868). It was published at age 20 and during the year he went on to serve as an instructor in Chemistry at the new Cornell University. Even after he left academia, his bookish qualities were well known. He would time his Cosmos Club library visits to coincide with the librarians' opening of the periodical mail and was keen on being the first to know, rather than the one to receive, the news.

== Personality, including humor ==
Clarke was not a hearty laugher. He was known to "ripple" quietly at exceptional displays of wit or humor. Clarke's humorous use of language was compared to Lewis Carroll and the talent was renowned at Washington D.C.'s Cosmos Club. Somewhat of a gossip, he specialized in knowing not only what people were currently doing, but also what their forebears had done. Clarke was known for a sharp wit, sometimes employing deadpan. While attending a friend's Thanksgiving dinner, Clarke noticed the host struggling with that metric of American male performance, the carving of the turkey. Clarke "suggested that it might profit the carver to visit the National Museum, for a certain door therein bears on it the sign 'Division of Birds'." A colleague recalled his dining habits at Washington D.C.'s Cosmos Club, "[s]hould you join him at lunch and when the waiter has served the butter this man has said, 'Take it away, please,' and of the potatoes, 'Take that away also,' and should he be eating of sweet potato and some one has remarked to him, 'Why I thought you did not like potatoes,' he replies, 'This is not potato, it is convolvulus . . ." Anger was not a Clarke character trait. Toward the end of his life, Clarke was described as "about five feet five inches in height, one hundred and ten pounds in weight, with pale blue eyes, little hair and most of that under his ears, chewing his finger nails and apparently absorbed in thought, though really most alert." His voice delivered in ". . . a low tone with a well-modulated and quite agreeable voice, using very well-chosen language, talking good sense, but with a mild undertone of gaiety, and you find him bright and entertaining and then you find him clever . . . ." In his communications, Clarke exhibited restraint in speaking either negatively or positively of others. His praise he reserved for the individual's absence and many were advanced in his profession by Clarke's recommendation out of the earshot of the candidate.

== Awards and honors ==
- Chevalier, Legion of Honor;
- Member, National Academy of Sciences;
- The Wilde Medal, Council of the Manchester Literary and Philosophical Society;
- The F.W. Clarke Award of the Geochemical Society is named after him;
- The mineral Clarkeite was named after him;
- On the proposal of the Russian geochemist Alexander Fersman, the abundances of chemical elements in the Earth's crust, as well as in other major geochemical Earth systems (hydrosphere, atmosphere, pedosphere, in the main types of rocks, etc.) are called in Russian "the Clarkes" ("кларки").
- Inaugural chairman of the International Committee of Atomic Weights
- In 1903, the only American (and Unitarian) ever invited to deliver a Memorial Address before The Chemical Society.
- Honorary membership of the Manchester Literary and Philosophical Society 28 April 1903

== Sample Publications ==
=== Scientific ===
- Clarke, Frank Wiggleworths; Washington, Henry Stephens (1924). "The composition of the Earth's crust" (PDF). USGS Report. 127. United States Geological Survey: 4. Bibcode:1924usgs.rept....4C. doi:10.3133/pp127. hdl:2027/mdp.39015050613622.
- Clarke, Frank Wiggleworths (1924). "The data of geochemistry" (PDF). Bulletin. 770 (5th ed.). United States Geological Survey: 3. Bibcode:1924usgs.rept....3C. doi:10.3133/b770.
- Clarke, Frank Wiggleworths (1920). "The data of geochemistry" (PDF). Bulletin. 695 (4th ed.). United States Geological Survey. doi:10.3133/b695.
- Clarke, Frank Wiggleworths (1916). "The data of geochemistry" (PDF). Bulletin. 616 (3rd ed.). United States Geological Survey. doi:10.3133/b616.
- Clarke, Frank Wiggleworths (1911). "The data of geochemistry" (PDF). Bulletin. 491 (2nd ed.). United States Geological Survey. doi:10.3133/b491.
- Clarke, Frank Wiggleworths (1908). "The data of geochemistry" (PDF). Bulletin. 330 (1st ed.). United States Geological Survey: 1. Bibcode:1908usgs.rept....1C. doi:10.3133/b330.
- USGS Water Supply Paper No.364 Water analyses from the laboratory of the United States Geological Survey , 1914;
- Analysis of rocks and minerals from the laboratory of the United States Geological Survey, 1880 to 1908, USGS Bulletin No. 419 (1910);
- Contributions to mineralogy from the United States Geological Survey, USGS Bulletin No. 262 (1905);
- Report of work done in the division of chemistry and physics mainly during the fiscal year 1884-85, USGS Bulletin No. 27 (1886);
- "Evolution and the Spectroscope," Popular Science Monthly (1873);
- "On a new process in mineral analysis; Contributions to Chemistry from the Laboratory of the Lawrence Scientific School," 45 Am. Jour. Sci. 173-80 (1868).

=== General ===
- "The Obituary of an Undertaker," Life Magazine;
- "The Mormon Widow's Lament, The Galaxy;
- "American colleges versus American science," 9 Pop. Sci. Monthly 467 (Aug. 1876);
- "The higher education," 7 Pop. Sci. Monthly 402 (Aug. 1875);
- "How to Play Solitaire, Riverside Magazine (Feb. 1870);
- Views around Ithaca, New York; Being a description of the waterfalls and ravines of this remarkable locality (1869).
- "Weights, measures, and money, of all nations", (1875) Online version

== Member ==
The American Association for the Advancement of Science (Section Q); American Chemical Society; Young Men's Christian Union; The Cosmos Club, Washington, D.C.; the Phi Kappa Psi fraternity at Cornell and the Irving Literary Society. In 1896, he served as president of the Philosophical Society of Washington. In 1904, he was elected as a member to the American Philosophical Society.
