= Batuecas =

Batuecas may refer to:

- Tomas Batuecas (1893–1972), Spanish chemist
- Las Batuecas, a valley and a river in the province of Salamanca, Castile and León, Spain
- Natural Park of Las Batuecas, Sierra de Francais, a natural area of the province of Salamanca, Castile and León, Spain
