= Esteban Terradas i Illa =

Spanish mathematician, scientist and engineer

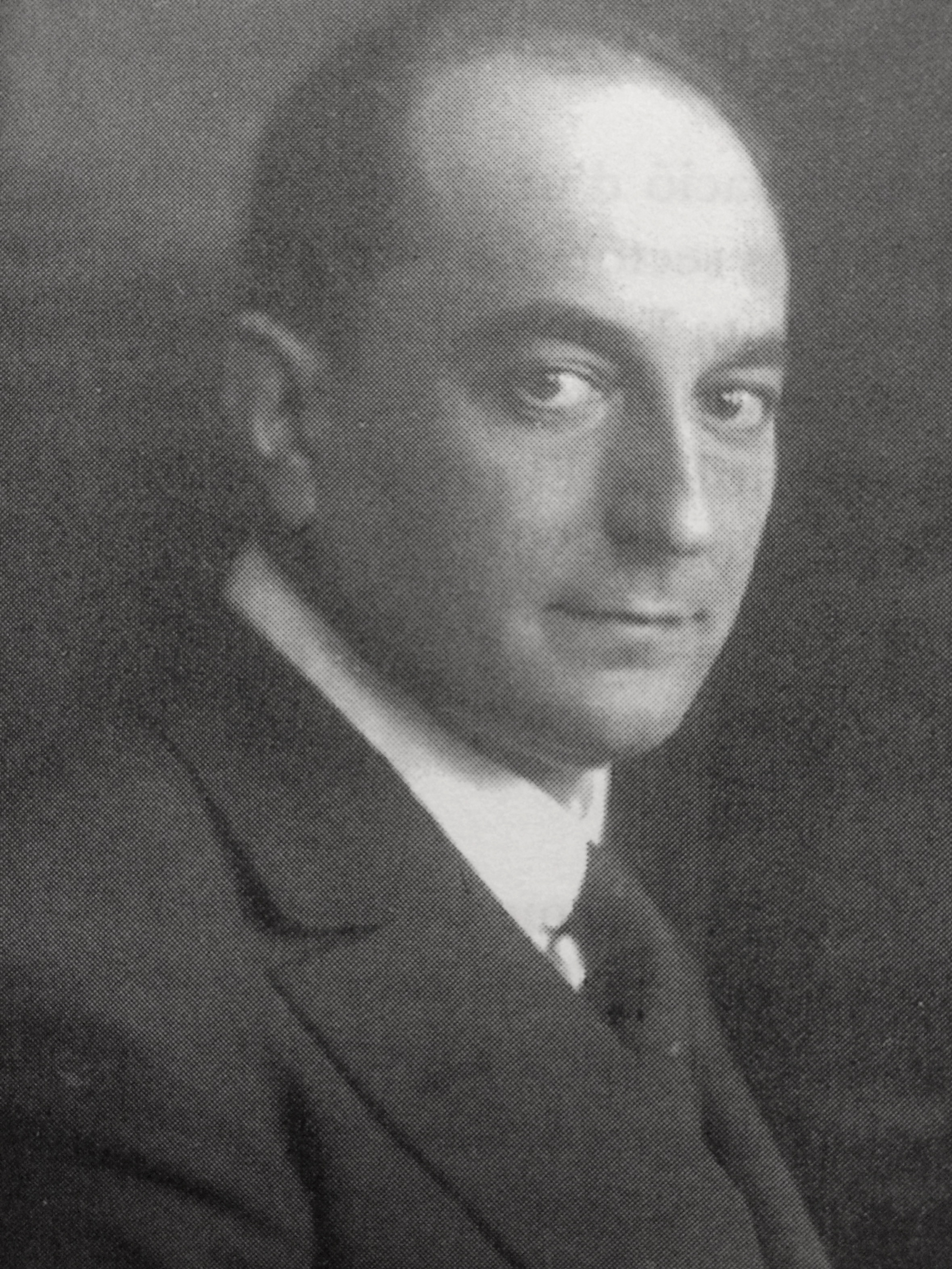
Esteve Terradas in 1925

Esteban Terrades i Illa (15 September 1883, in Barcelona – 9 May 1950, in Madrid) also known as Esteve Terradas, was a Spanish mathematician, scientist and engineer. He researched and taught widely in the fields of mathematics and the physical sciences, working not only in his native Catalonia, but also in the rest of Spain and in South America. He was also active as a consultant in the Spanish aeronautics, electric power, telephone and railway industries.

== Education and academic career ==
He held two doctorates (in mathematics and physics) on 1904, as well as two degrees in engineering, from the ETSEIB school. He was professor of mathematical analysis (teaching differential equations) and later of mathematical physics at Barcelona Central University. He also taught acoustics, optics, electricity, magnetism and classical mechanics at the University of Barcelona, teaching mechanics also at the University of Zaragoza, University of Buenos Aires and the University of La Plata (Argentina) and Montevideo (Uruguay). He was a Member of the Royal Academy of the Spanish Language and active in the Royal Academy of Exact, Physical and Natural Sciences and the Royal Academy of Sciences and Arts of Barcelona. He was granted honorary doctorates by the Universities of Buenos Aires, University of Santiago (Chile) and University of Toulouse (France) and established as an honorary member of the Royal Academy of Medicine of Barcelona, the Association of Argentine Engineers, and of the Society of Engineers of Peru among many other honors. He was an Invited Speaker at the ICM in 1912 in Cambridge, England.

He studied at Charlottenburg in Berlin, Barcelona and Madrid. Known as an exceptional student, entered the University in 1898, when was only 15 years old. He held professorships in the universities of Zaragoza, Barcelona and Madrid, specializing in physical and mathematical sciences and publishing numerous articles about those subjects. In 1909, while at the Academy of Sciences and Arts of Barcelona, he produced an important work entitled Emisión de radiaciones por cuerpos fijos o en movimiento.

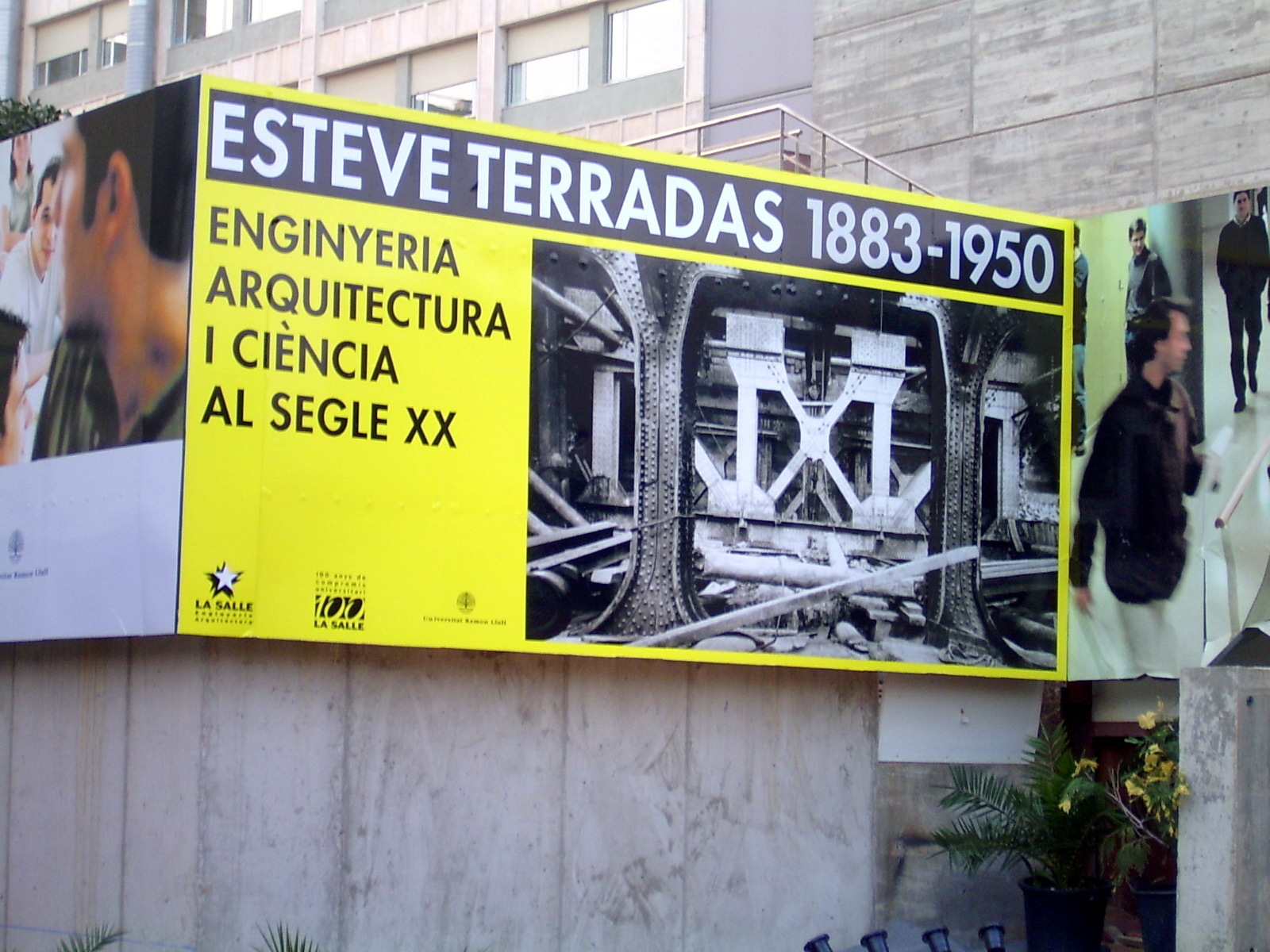
Poster at the exhibition entry in homage to Terradas at the Escola d'Enginieria i Arquitectura de la Salle (Barcelona) in year 2004.

His teaching and pedagogical activity was also important. He published articles in the "Revista de la Academia de Ciencias" in Madrid, and in the bulletin of the Institute of Sciences of Barcelona. He set up a physics-mathematics seminar, to which he brought some of the best regarded scientists of his time. He became a founding member of the Sciences Section of the Institute of Catalan Studies in 1911, within the framework of the Monographic Courses of High Studies of Exchange promoted by the Commonwealth of Catalonia. He also participated in the Minerva Collection, where he published "The radium". In 1919 set up the Institute of Electricity and Applied Mechanics and was its director; he was also a teacher of the section of electrotechnics of the Escola del Treball.

He was interested in photography, a new practice in the early 20th century, using it to illustrate his technical and scientific works as well as his personal life.

The theories of quanta and relativity captivated him, and he invited such figures as Jacques Hadamard (1921), Hermann Weyl (1921), Arnold Sommerfeld (1922), Tullio Levi-Civita (1922) and Albert Einstein (1923) to Barcelona. Einstein's Spanish visit, between 22 and 28 February 1923, was a notable success, organized by Terradas, the Catalan Government, the Mancomunitat, and Rafael Campalans. Terradas was also the driving force behind a series of scientific monographs that were a compilation of these lectures, his own and the works of others (including Julio Palacios, Julio Rey Pastor and Jacques Hadamard), published by the Institute of Catalan Studies under the title "Physics and Mathematics Courses".

He lectured at several universities in South America: in Buenos Aires and Rio de la Plata (Uruguay) from 1936 to 39. Terradas was the first professor to hold the chair in Differential Equation when it was first established in Madrid in 1932.

== Industries consultant ==
On 1918, Terrades was chosen to drive the Xarxa de Ferrocarrils Secundaris de Catalunya (Secondary Net of Catalan Railways), intended to decentralize Catalonia, but was never completed due to the dictatorship of Primo de Rivera being established on 13 September 1923.

He was a technical director of the Commonwealth of Catalonia railways, he directed (1923–25) and projected the construction of the Transversal Metropolitan Railway of Barcelona and other Catalan railway lines.

It is said that the President of the Commonwealth of Catalonia, Josep Puig i Cadafalch, entrusted him a study about the stability of the turn of plain brick, known as the "Catalan turn", which is kept at the archive of the Institute of Catalan Studies.

From 1940 onwards he worked for the Spanish Instituto Nacional de Industria, becoming one of the top consultants of the Spanish industrial development along the 40s. He specially was involved in the planning and design of the power plants built by Endesa by that time. He worked too at the Compañía Telefónica Nacional de España and served as a member of the Spanish National Research Council.

In 1942 he created the Spanish Instituto Nacional de Técnica Aeroespacial / INTA (National Institute of the Aerospace Technology), that after Terrade's death received his name. As INTA chairman, Terrades maintained along the late forties a sustained and fruitful professional relationship with Theodore von Karman.

== Works ==
In (1910) he published "Discrete elements of matter and radiation", "Corrientes marinas" (1941) and, to gain entry to the Royal Academy of the Spanish Language, the volume "Neologismos, arcanismos in plàtica de ingenieros" (1946). As an encyclopedist, he authored several articles in the Espasa Encyclopedia, including those on Celestial Mechanics, the Moon and relativity.
