= Karl Seubert =

German chemist (1851–1942)

- Born: 6 April 1851; Karlsruhe
- Died: 31 January 1942 (aged 90); Hannover
- Known for: Determination of atomic weights
- Scientific career
- Fields: Analytical chemistry
- Workplaces: University of Tübingen; University of Hannover
- Doctoral advisor: Lothar Meyer

Karl Friedrich Otto Seubert (6 April 1851 – 31 January 1942) was a prominent German chemist notable for his work on atomic weights of platinum elements. He was the son of the German botanist Moritz August Seubert and Maria Seubert.

Karl Seubert became apothecary in Manheim in 1869 and was soldier in the Franco-Prussian War. In 1874, Seubert became lecture assistant to Lothar Meyer in Tübingen. He later returned to Tübingen in 1878 to study chemistry with Meyer.

In 1885 Seubert became Professor in Tübingen and in 1895 he moved to University of Hannover as the successor of Karl Kraut where he remained until 1921. Seubert's work on atomic weights earned him international reputation and in 1902 he was elected inaugural member of the International Atomic Weights Committee.
