= Clarkeite =

Uranium oxide mineral

General
- Category: Minerals
- Formula: (Na,Ca,Pb)_{2}(UO_{2})_{2}(O,OH)_{3} or (Na,Ca,Pb)(UO_{2})O(OH)•0-1H_{2}O
- IMA symbol: Cke
- Strunz classification: 4.GC.05
- Dana classification: 5.4.1.1
- Crystal system: Trigonal
- Space group: R3̅m (No. 166)
- Unit cell: 239.11 Å^{3} (Calculated from unit cell)

Identification
- Colour: Dark red-brown, dark brown
- Cleavage: None observed
- Fracture: Conchoidal, sub-conchoidal
- Mohs scale hardness: 4–4.5
- Luster: Resinous, waxy, greasy
- Streak: Yellow-brown
- Diaphaneity: Translucent
- Specific gravity: 6.39
- Density: 6.39 g/cm^{3} (Measured)
- Birefringence: 0.111
- Pleochroism: Weak
- 2V angle: Measured 30° to 50°, Calculated 32°
- Dispersion: Relatively weak
- Other characteristics: Radioactive

Clarkeite is a uranium oxide mineral with the chemical formula(Na,Ca,Pb)_{2}(UO_{2})_{2}(O,OH)_{3} or (Na,Ca,Pb)(UO_{2})O(OH)·0-1H_{2}O.

Its color varies from dark brown to reddish orange. Clarkeite forms by oxidation and replacement of uraninite late during pegmatite crystallization. Although uraninite-bearing granite pegmatites are common, clarkeite is rare and occurs intimately intergrown with other uranium minerals.

It is known from only two localities; the Spruce Pine pegmatite district in western North Carolina, US, and Rajputana, in the Ajmer district, India. Clarkeite is the only known naturally occurring high-temperature uranate. The general formula for ideal clarkeite is Na[(UO_{2})O(OH)](H_{2}O)_{0–1}.

It was named for Frank Wigglesworth Clarke (1847–1931), American mineral chemist, and former chief chemist of the United States Geological Survey.

== See also ==
- List of minerals
- List of minerals named after people
- Sodium uranate
