= Enrique Moles Ormella =

- Born: 26 August 1883; Vila de Gràcia, Barcelona
- Died: 30 March 1953 (aged 69); Madrid
- Education: Complutense University of Madrid; University of Geneva
- Known for: Determination of atomic weights
- Awards: Grand Officer Order of the Spanish Republic (1933); Legion of Honour (1936); Lavoisier Medal (1937)
- Scientific career
- Fields: Physical chemistry

Enrique Moles Ormella (26 August 1883 – 30 March 1953) was a Spanish pharmacist, physicist, and chemist, most notable for his work on atomic weights of the elements. Enrique Moles is considered one of the foremost Spanish chemists of his time.

== Life ==
=== Early life ===
Enrique Moles was born on 26 August 1883 in Vila de Gràcia near Barcelona to Pedro Moles Alrich and Maria Ormella Figuerola, both of which died while he was still infant. (Note: Several conflicting dates are claimed. For example, the historian of chemistry, Ralph Oesper, gives the birth date as 25 July 1883 (pubs.acs.org/doi/pdfplus/10.1021/ed013p368) while Prof. A. Guye of the University of Geneva gives 21 July 1883 in his letter of certification dated 10 July 1917 (Berrojo Jario 1981; p. 945). The date of 26 Aug 1883 appears in the Civil Register.)

=== Studies ===
Moles obtained the bachelor's degree from Colegio Iberico in Barcelona, and in 1900 he entered to study pharmacy at the Complutense University of Madrid. In 1906, he obtained the Doctor of Pharmacy. In 1909, Moles went to study at the Ludwig-Maximilians-Universität München (LMU) and he attended the University of Leipzig in 1910 to work on determination of atomic weights under K. Drucker. In 1916, Moles studied with Philippe A. Guye at the University of Geneva to establish the atomic weight of bromine, and he received the degree Doctor of Physics from the University of Geneva that year. In 1920, after combining all previous studies of chemistry (in Munich, Leipzig, and Zurich), Moles qualified for the third doctoral degree, Doctor of Chemistry. The title of his chemistry doctoral thesis was “Physico-chemical revision of the atomic weight of fluorine: contribution to the chemistry of this element”, and he formally received the degree from the Complutense University of Madrid only in 1926. (Note: Moles never received the "fourth" Doctorate in chemistry from the University of Leipzig)

=== Career ===
Moles represented Spain in the 2nd General Conference of IUPAC (1921) and later served as the vice-president of IUPAC from 1934-1938. In 1949, Moles attended the meeting of the International Atomic Weight Commission as a prospective member and was elected the first Secretary of the Commission (the Secretary position was created during that meeting). (Note: Enrique Moles was proposed to be a member of the Atomic Weights Commission in 1921, but was not confirmed) Moles served as the secretary of the Commission until his death in 1953.

=== Civil war ===
The Spanish Civil War was a turning point in Moles' career. In 1936, he was a professor and vice-rector of the Complutense University of Madrid, department head of the National Institute of Physics and Chemistry, the Secretary of the Spanish Society of Physics and Chemistry, a member of the Spanish Royal Academy of Sciences. At the time of the outbreak, Moles took over the leadership of the National Institute of Physics and Chemistry (Blas Cabrera Felipe had moved to Paris), and in 1937 Moles was appointed Director of Explosives at this institution, which was now used for military purposes by the Republican government. In 1937, Moles was appointed Director of Explosives. In 1939 Moles fled to France where he signed the manifesto "Against the Fascist barbarity," published by El Socialista newspaper on the day after the aerial bombardment of Madrid. This made him the object of reprisals by the Nationalist government upon his return from France in December 1941. He was expelled from the University in January 1944, and joined the Instituto de Biología y Sueroterapia (IBYS) as technical advisor.

== Honors ==
The Institute for Organometallic Chemistry of University of Oviedo was named after Enrique Moles in 1992.
