= Kenneth Wade =

British chemist

Kenneth Wade FRSC FRS
- Born: 13 October 1932; Sleaford, Lincolnshire, UK
- Died: 16 March 2014 (aged 81); Stroud, Gloucestershire, UK
- Citizenship: United Kingdom
- Education: University of Nottingham
- Known for: Polyhedral skeletal electron pair theory
- Awards: Ludwig Mond Award (1999)
- Scientific career
- Fields: Electrochemistry
- Workplaces: Durham University
- Doctoral advisor: Norman Greenwood

Kenneth Wade, FRSC FRS (1932–2014) was a British chemist and professor emeritus at Durham University.

== Early life and education ==
Kenneth Wade was born in Sleaford on 13 October 1932, the second son of Harry Kennington Wade and his wife, Anna Elizabeth Wade. He was educated at Carre's Grammar School, and graduated from the University of Nottingham as the first PhD student (1954–1957) of Norman Greenwood, and Cornell University.

== Career ==
After spending two years as a post-doctoral student at the University of Cambridge and two further years lecturing successively at Cornell University and Derby College of Technology, in 1961 Wade became a Lecturer at Durham University. In 1971, he was appointed Senior Lecturer and was promoted to Reader in 1977. Between 1983 and 1998, he was Professor of Chemistry at the university and served, between 1986 and 1989, as chairman of its Department of Chemistry.

Wade's Rules, also known as polyhedral skeletal electron pair theory, are a set of electron counting rules to predict the shapes of borane clusters.

== Awards ==
- 1982: Main Group Award, Royal Society of Chemistry.
- 1999: Tilden Prize, Royal Society of Chemistry.
- 1989: Fellow, Royal Society.
- 1999: Ludwig Mond Award, Royal Society of Chemistry.
- 2012: Chancellor's Medal, University of Durham.
