= Blas Cabrera =

Spanish physicist (1878–1945)

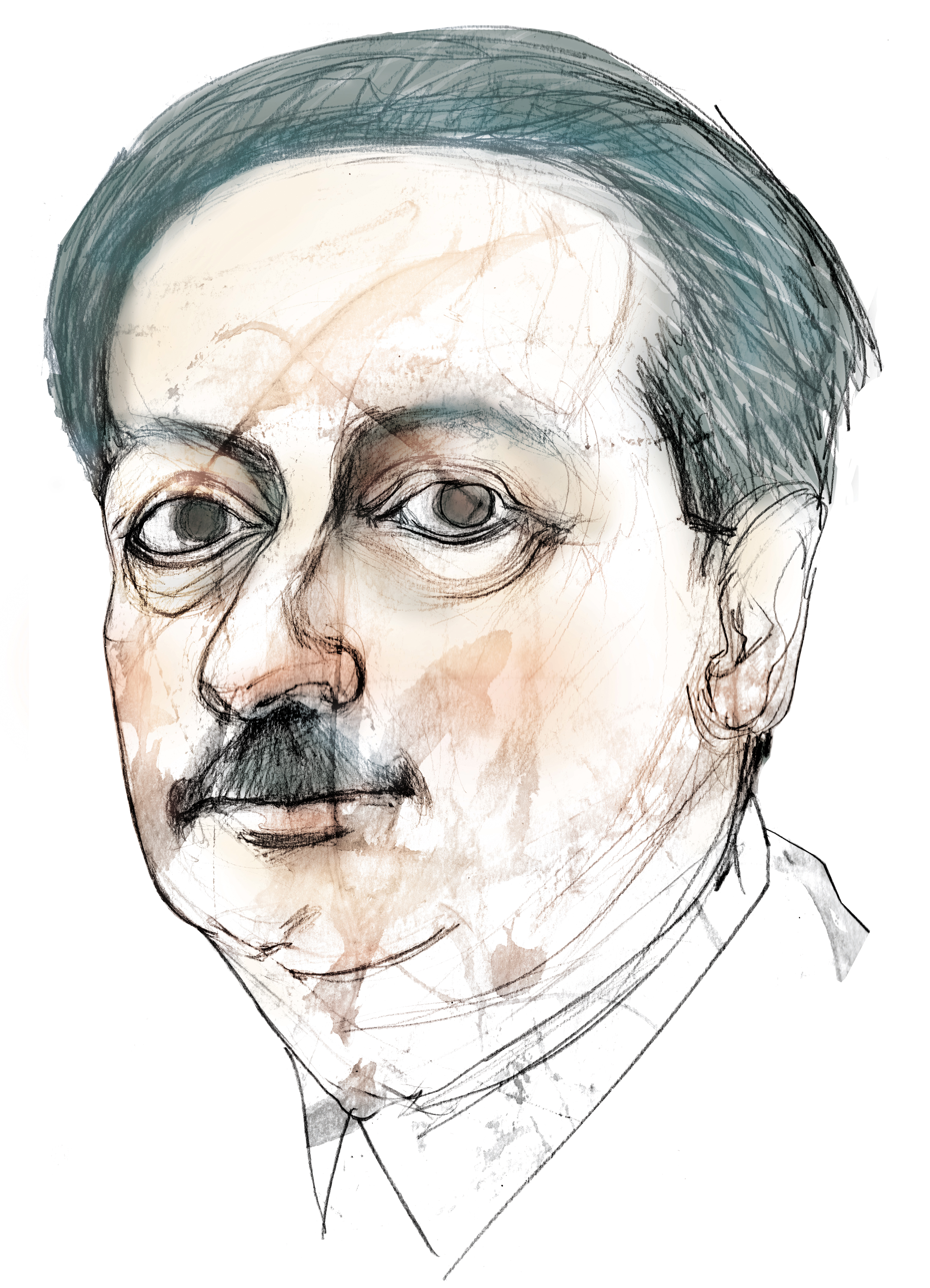
- Blas Cabrera by Eulogia Merle
- Born: Blas Cabrera y Felipe; 20 May 1878; Arrecife, Lanzarote, Spain
- Died: 1 August 1945 (aged 67); Mexico City, Mexico
- Education: Universidad Central de Madrid
- Children: Nicolás Cabrera
- Relatives: Blas Cabrera Navarro (grandson)
- Scientific career
- Fields: Physics, magnetism
- Workplaces: Spanish Royal Academy of Sciences, French Academy of Sciences Royal Spanish Academy, Menéndez Pelayo International University
- Doctoral advisor: Santiago Ramón y Cajal

Seat I of the Real Academia Española
- In office 26 January 1936 – 1 August 1945
- Preceded by: Santiago Ramón y Cajal (Note: Ramón y Cajal was elected for the position in 1905 but never took the seat)
- Succeeded by: Gerardo Diego

Blas Cabrera y Felipe (May 20, 1878 – August 1, 1945) was a Spanish physicist. He worked in the domain of experimental physics with focus in the magnetic properties of matter. He is considered one of the greatest scientists of Spain and one of the founders of the study of physical sciences in his country.

== Education ==
Cabrera received his baccalaureate in La Laguna (Tenerife, Spain). He then moved to Madrid where he began studying law, following family tradition. He met at that time Santiago Ramón y Cajal, who convinced him to abandon law and study science. He graduated from the Universidad Central de Madrid (present day Complutense University of Madrid) in Physics and Mathematics, earning a doctorate in Physics in 1901 with thesis Sobre la Variación Diurna de la Componente Horizontal del Viento written under the supervision of Santiago Ramón y Cajal.

== Career ==
He was an experimental physicist, and developed his interests mostly in the field of magnetic properties of matter, achieving a prominent position among the physicists of his era. In 1903 he participated in the foundation of the Spanish Society of Physics and Chemistry and the annals of that society. In 1905, he obtained the chair of Electricity and Magnetism in the Universidad Central. He married María Sánchez Real in 1909. In 1910, the Junta de Ampliación de Estudios created the Laboratorio de Investigaciones Físicas, of which Cabrera was appointed as director. The Laboratory had five lines of investigation: magnetochemistry, physical chemistry, electrochemistry, electroanalysis and spectroscopy, and contributed greatly to the research and development of physics in Spain. With a grant from the Junta de Ampliación de Estudios (1912), Cabrera visited several European research centers including the Physics Laboratory of the Politechnic of Zurich (directed by Pierre Weiss), in which he carried out experiments in magnetochemistry. He also visited the physics laboratories of the universities of Geneva and Heidelberg, and the International Bureau of Weights and Measures in Paris.

On returning to Spain, Cabrera used the techniques he had learned during his European tour, especially those developed in the Zurich laboratory, to continue his research on magnetism, in collaboration with other researchers such as Enrique Moles Ormella and Arturo Duperier Vallesa.

Cabrera's research work was prolific. Between 1910 and 1934 he published about 110 works (Pierre Weiss, then director of Strasbourg University's Physics Institute, commented in 1932 that among the 180 articles about magnetism present in the institute's library, 24 came from the Laboratorio de Investigaciones Físicas which Cabrera directed). He interpreted magnetization curves in terms of the Weiss magneton. He modified Curie-Weiss's law, which describes the magnetic susceptibility of a ferromagnetic material in the paramagnetic region beyond Curie point, and deduced an equation to describe an atom's magnetic moment taking into account the effect of temperature.

At the same time, he improved many experimental devices. He was the first scientist in Spain to use the methods of the theory of errors and of the least squares for the determination of physical constants. Some of his measures of magnetic susceptibility continue to be the most precise in existence.

However, his work was not solely investigation. He was also a great publisher and disseminator of modern theories of physics that were defined in the first thirty years of the 20th century. Thus, in 1912 he published an article in the magazine Real Academia de Ciencias Exactas, Físicas y Naturales titled "Fundamental principles of vectorial analysis in three-dimensional space and in Minkowski space" ("Principios fundamentales del análisis vectorial en el espacio de tres dimensiones y en el Universo de Minkowski"). Along with the review published in 1912 by Esteban Terradas of Max von Laue's book Das Relativitätsprincip, which had appeared the previous year, these works were meant to introduce the special theory of relativity to Spain.

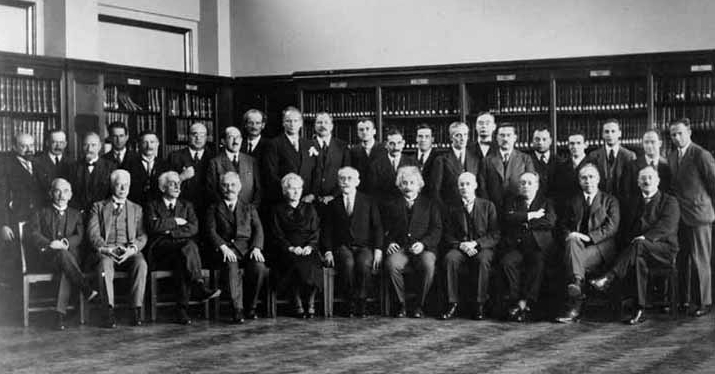
Photograph of the participants to the sixth Solvay Conference of 1930. Cabrera appears in the first row, seated, third from the viewer's right. He is seated between Owen Willans Richardson and Niels Bohr. Standing behind Cabrera are Wolfgang Pauli immediately to the right and Peter Debye to the left. Werner Heisenberg is standing on the extreme right. Albert Einstein is also seated next to Richardson. Paul Langevin is seated between Einstein and Marie Curie.

Cabrera's work was also recognized on an international level. Cabrera was host to Albert Einstein during his visit to Spain in 1923. In 1928 he became a member of the French Academy of Sciences, sponsored by physicists Paul Langevin and Maurice de Broglie. That year he received the greatest recognition of his whole career: at the request of Einstein and Marie Curie, Cabrera was named a member of the 6th Scientific Committee of the Solvay Conference. These conferences, held triannually, brought together the world's finest physicists. In the Solvay Conference of 1930, Cabrera participated with a paper titled "The magnetic properties of matter."

In 1929, Cabrera replaced Leonardo Torres Quevedo, who had abandoned his post due to health problems, at the International Bureau of Weights and Measures.In 1931 he was named director of the Universidad Central de Madrid. A year later, along with other scientists such as Miguel A. Catalán and his disciple, Julio Palacios, he pushed for the creation of the National Institute of Physics and Chemistry with the aid of a donation from the Rockefeller Foundation, and placed at the building known as the "Rockefeller building" at Serrano Street in Madrid. (Today the Rocasolano Chemical-Physics Institute, of the Spanish National Research Council, is located there.)

== Spanish Civil War and exile ==
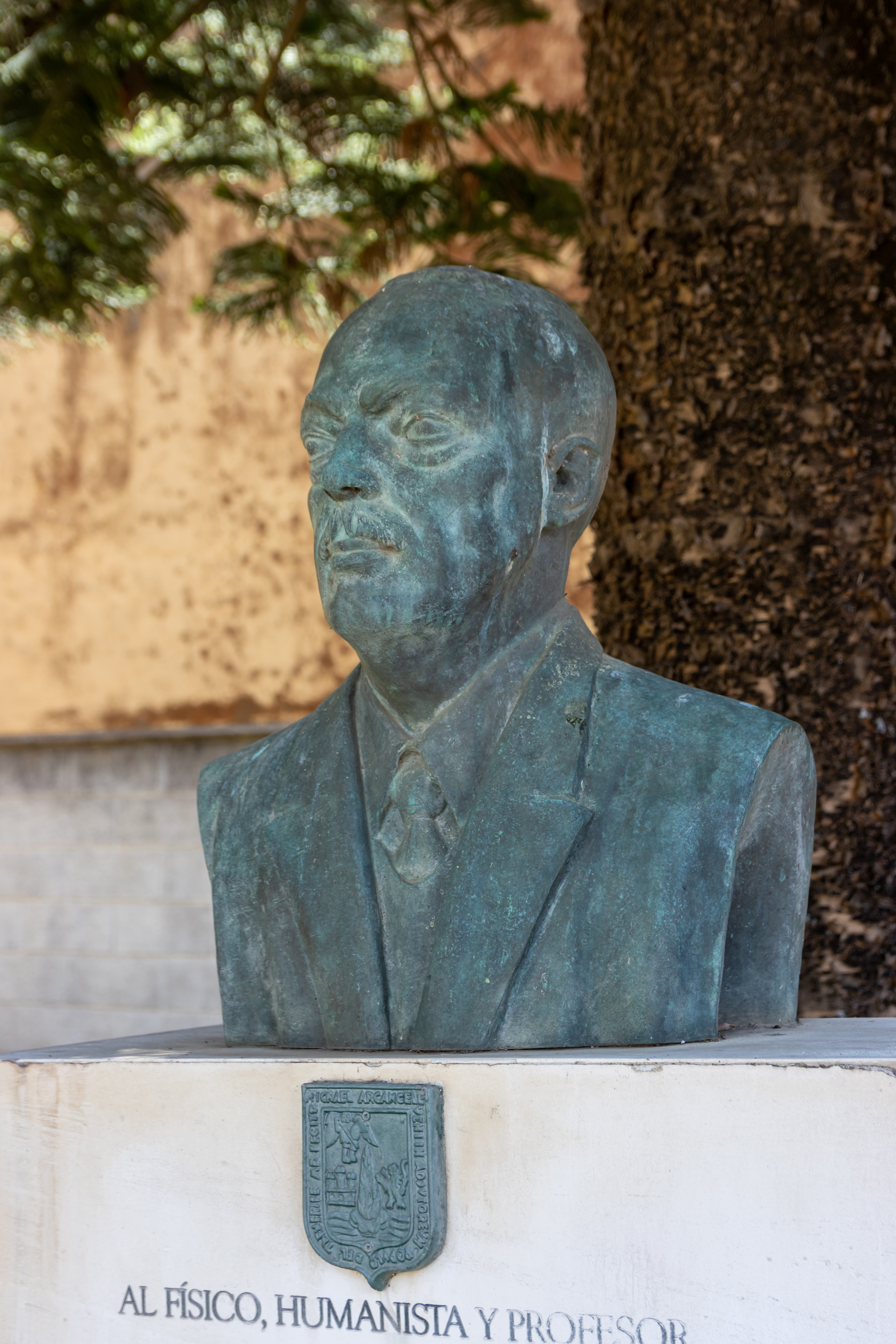
Bust in San Cristóbal de La Laguna

In 1933, he participated in the creation of the Summer International University of Santander (now the Universidad Internacional Menéndez Pelayo), being called as its director the following year. In 1936, he was in Santander at the outbreak of the Spanish Civil War. He moved to Republican Madrid, traveling through France. In 1937, the president of the International Bureau of Weights and Measures, Pieter Zeeman, named him secretary of that bureau, a post that he would occupy between 1937 and 1941, and he went to live to Paris. Nevertheless, after the end of the war, the Franco government demanded that he leave the post, even though the position had no representative value with respect to Spain. Cabrera resigned and went into self-exile in Mexico, where he was welcomed by the Faculty of Sciences at the Universidad Nacional Autónoma de México, in which he became a Professor of Atomic Physics and History of Physics. In 1944 he began to direct the magazine Ciencia, edited by exiled Spanish scientists; after Cabrera's death the post passed to Ignacio Bolívar. In this same year, the Spanish Cultural Institution of Buenos Aires published his last work, El magnetismo de la materia. He died in exile in Mexico in 1945.

== Positions ==
Cabrera held several positions and belonged to numerous institutions: member and president of the Real Academia de Ciencias Exactas, Físicas y Naturales, member of the Real Academia Española (where he occupied the chair of his friend and teacher Santiago Ramón y Cajal), president of the Sociedad Española de Física y Química, director of the Laboratory of Physics Investigations (of the Junta para Ampliación de Estudios), director of the Instituto Nacional de Física y Química, foreign member of the French Academy of Sciences, member of the Scientific Committee of the 6th Solvay Conference of 1930 (Brussels), director of the Universidad Central de Madrid and of the Universidad Internacional Menéndez Pelayo, and secretary of the International Bureau of Weights and Measures in Paris. He was also a member, along with several Nobel Prize winners in Physics and Chemistry, of the sponsorship committee of the Society of Friends of André-Marie Ampère, which in 1931 created the first interactive scientific museum in France, the Ampère Museum.

== Works ==
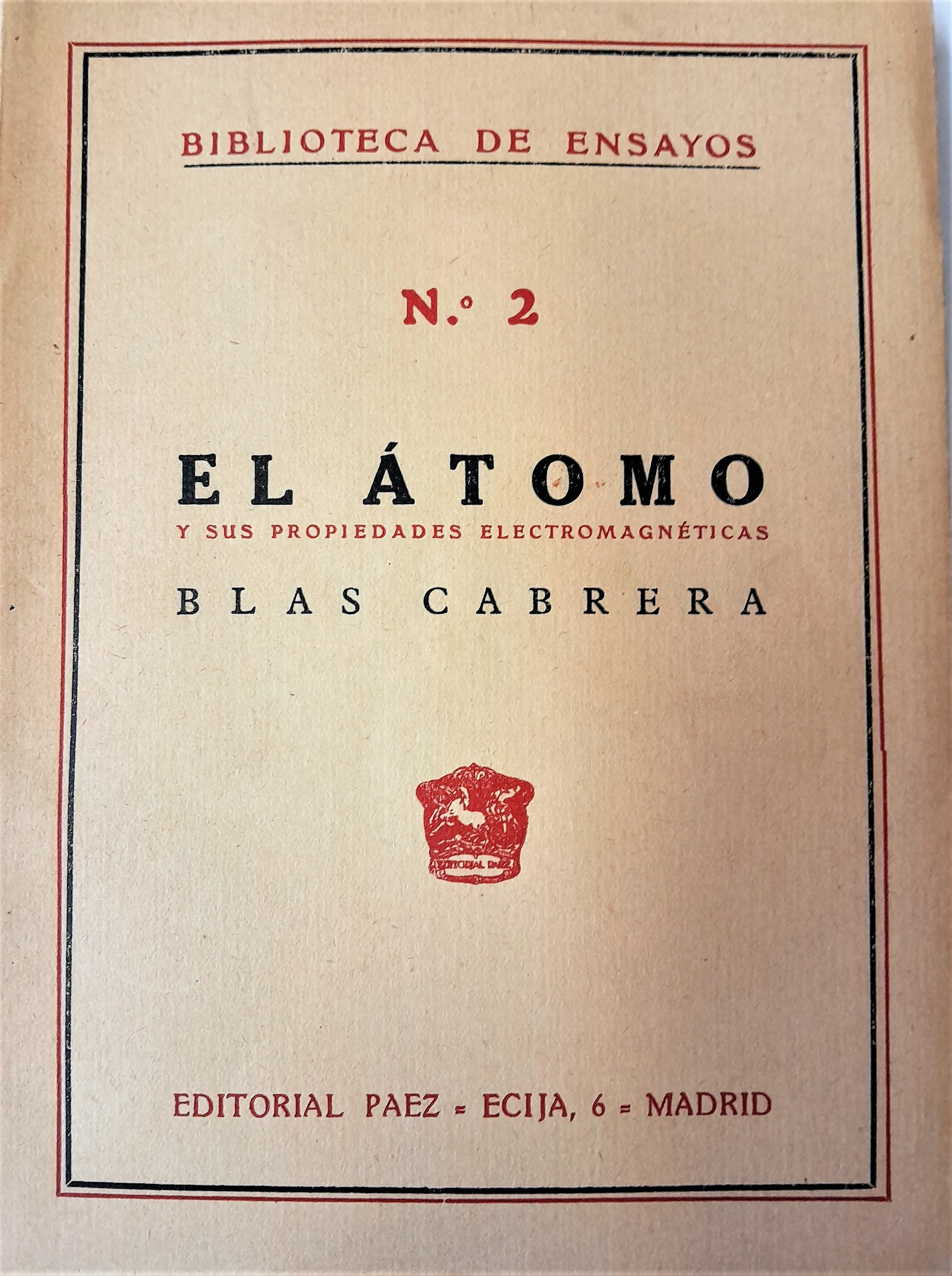
"El Átomo y sus propiedades electromagnéticas" (1927) by Blas Cabera

- La teoria de los magnetones y la magnetoquímica de los compuestos férricos (1912).
- Principios fundamentales de análisis vectorial en el espacio de tres dimensiones y en el Universo de Minkowski (1912 13).
- Estado actual de la teoría de los rayos X y Y. Su aplicación al estudio de la estructura de la materia (1915).
- ¿Qué es la electricidad? (1917).
- MagnétoChimie (1918).
- El estado actual de la teoría del magnetismo (19161919).
- Principio de relatividad (1923).
- Paramagnetismo y estructura del átomo y de la molécula (19232627).
- El átomo y sus propiedades electromagnéticas (1927).
- L'étude expérimentale du paramagnétisme. Le magnéton (1931).
- Electricidad y teoría de la materia (1933).
- Diaet paramagnétisme et structure de la matiére (1937).
- El atomismo y su evolución (1942).
- El magnetismo de la materia (1944).
