= Julio Palacios (physicist) =

Spanish physicist (1891–1970)

- Palacios in 1916
- Born: Julio Palacios Martínez; April 12, 1891; Paniza, Aragon, Spain
- Died: February 21, 1970 (aged 78); Madrid, Spain
- Occupations: Physicist; professor
- Spouse: Elena Calleya Pedroso
- Awards: Grand Cross of the Order of Charles III (1982); Gold Medal of Merit in Labour (1969)

Academic background
- Education: University of Barcelona (Lic.); University of Madrid (PhD)
- Doctoral advisor: Blas Cabrera Felipe

Academic work
- Discipline: Physics
- Institutions: University of Madrid; Junta for Further Education and Scientific Research; University of Lisbon; National Institute of Physics and Chemistry

Julio Palacios Martínez (April 12, 1891 – February 21, 1970) was a Spanish physicist. After early experimental work on low temperature noble gases at Leiden University, he led the first work on X-ray crystallography in Spain at Madrid's National Institute of Physics and Chemistry and served as a professor of thermology at the University of Madrid.

A monarchist and practicing Catholic, he remained in Madrid during the Spanish Civil War, and historians describe him as an agent of intelligence for the Nationalist faction in the besieged city. In 1939, the newly ascendant Francoist regime placed him over the former institutions of the Junta for Further Education and Scientific Research (JAE). He was later pushed aside, and in 1945 he was confined to Almansa after backing the claim of Juan de Borbón to the throne.

Palacios belonged to the Royal Spanish Academy, the Spanish Royal Academy of Sciences, which he presided over from 1966 until his death, and the Royal National Academy of Medicine. He wrote widely used physics textbooks and a treatise on dimensional analysis that was published in French and English. From the mid-1950s, he criticized Albert Einstein's theory of relativity and proposed an alternative theory that kept absolute space and time, a position that most Spanish physicists did not share. He received the Gold Medal of Merit in Labour in 1969 and, posthumously, the Grand Cross of the Order of Charles III.

== Early life and education ==
Palacios was born in Paniza, in the Campo de Cariñena district of Zaragoza Province, the second child of Miguel Palacios Cabello, the town's physician, and Eusebia Martínez Lostalé in 1891. The family moved to Deza and then, in 1900, to Tamarite de Litera in Huesca Province, where he began his schooling with the Piarists. He finished secondary school at the institute in Huesca. Historians Rosario Fernández Terán and Francisco González Redondo describe his family as cultured, strongly conservative, and devoutly Catholic, and report that during his schooling he lived under the care of an uncle who was the bishop of Huesca.

In 1907, he started university science courses in Zaragoza, intending to enter the school for agricultural engineers, and in 1908 he moved to the University of Barcelona. There he became a favored student of Esteve Terradas i Illa and earned a licentiate in exact and physical sciences in 1911, with top marks and an extraordinary prize. That year, on Terradas's recommendation, he presented himself to Blas Cabrera Felipe at the Laboratory of Physical Research of the JAE in Madrid. He completed his doctoral thesis under Cabrera's supervision and presented it in 1914, again winning an extraordinary prize. While finishing the thesis, he completed military service in the regiment of Alfonso de Orleans, which historians Fernández Terán and González Redondo identify as the origin of his ties to the Spanish royal family.

== Career ==
=== Leiden, X-ray work, and the National Institute ===
Palacios became an auxiliary professor of general physics at the Faculty of Sciences in 1915. In April 1916, at the age of 25, he won the chair of thermology at the Central University of Madrid by means of a competition. He held the chair until 1961. On Cabrera's advice and with a JAE grant, he went to Leiden University in 1916 to work with Heike Kamerlingh Onnes in the low-temperature laboratory, where he studied the isotherms of neon and other noble gases, publishing in Dutch, English, and Spanish. At Leiden, he attended Hendrik Lorentz's courses on theoretical physics and Paul Ehrenfest's colloquia. He returned to Spain after the armistice and in 1919 published his first papers on neon isotherms with Heike Kamerlingh Onnes and Claude August Crommelin.

Beginning in 1922, he took charge of the X-ray section of the Laboratory of Physical Research and set up equipment for studying crystal structures with the powder diffraction method of Debye and Scherrer. The high cost of the necessary apparatus meant he could not continue the low-temperature work he had done in Leiden. In 1923, he took part in organizing Einstein's visit to Spain, and in 1927 he joined the committee that planned the University City of Madrid, which was chaired by King Alfonso XIII. He served as president of the Spanish Society of Physics and Chemistry, and in 1928 he persuaded the king to grant the society the title "Royal". (Note: Oliva gives his presidency as 1927 to 1928, while the chronology by González de Posada and colleagues places his election in 1927 and Fernández Terán and González Redondo date the royal title to 1928.)

In 1926, Palacios published a paper in Annalen der Physik on the emission of light according to the atomic model of Ernest Rutherford and Niels Bohr. Drawing on Wilhelm Wien's measurements of the luminosity of canal rays, he analyzed emission in lines of the Balmer series of hydrogen. He concluded that the Planck constant could be understood as the product of a quantum of time and a quantum of energy, a proposal that Oliva calls somewhat heterodox. The paper appeared in the same year as Erwin Schrödinger's first papers on wave mechanics, and it was this coincidence that prompted Oliva's biographical study. Later that year, his student Felisa Martín Bravo became the first woman in Spain to attain a doctorate in physics.

The National Institute of Physics and Chemistry, funded by the Rockefeller Foundation, opened its building in 1932 with Arnold Sommerfeld, Paul Scherrer, and Pierre Weiss attending. Cabrera directed the institute, and Palacios headed its X-ray section, with one assistant, Rafael Salvia, and seven collaborators. From 1931, he was also the first holder of the Cajal Chair, which the Spanish community in Argentina had endowed, and its funding supported thirteen papers on X-ray studies of crystal structures between 1932 and 1946. The section's lines of work included determining the structures of simple compounds, studying metals, and measuring atomic scattering factors, and one of its young researchers, Julio Garrido, wrote the first article in the first volume of Acta Crystallographica in 1948. He took his seat in the Royal Academy of Sciences on April 8, 1932, with a lecture on quantum mechanics that Cabrera answered. In 1935, the Republican government of Spain sent him on a cultural mission to the Philippines with the poet Gerardo Diego, and he wrote a book about the trip.

=== Civil War and the postwar reorganization ===
Palacios was a monarchist and a Catholic. He wrote on science for the newspaper El Debate, which Ángel Herrera Oria directed, and in 1926 the dictator Miguel Primo de Rivera appointed him to the JAE. Under the Second Spanish Republic he was active in the rightist parties Acción Nacional and later Renovación Española and the CEDA, and in the circle around the journal Acción Española.

He stayed in Madrid throughout the Civil War, protected by his brother Miguel, a medical officer in the Republican Fifth Regiment. Fernández Terán and González Redondo write that he acted as a fifth columnist for Franco in the besieged city and, as an agent of the Francoist Military Information and Police Service in February and March 1939, took a significant part in the talks with Segismundo Casado and Julián Besteiro that preceded the end of the war. He kept a diary of those events, and he received the Campaign Medal with the vanguard badge.

On the day Franco's forces entered Madrid, March 29, 1939, Palacios was named acting head of the National Institute of Physics and Chemistry, and the next day he became vice-rector of the University of Madrid. On April 26 he was appointed vice-president of the Institute of Spain, whose president, the composer Manuel de Falla, was abroad and never took up the post. On May 1 the Ministry of National Education gave him supreme direction of the science centers in Madrid that had belonged to the JAE. He appointed provisional directors to these centers in the weeks that followed, leading historians to call him the "last president" of the JAE. The formal review of his own conduct as a university official was a formality, and he returned to his chair on July 27, 1939. From August to October of that year, he lectured in Uruguay and Argentina to restore ties between the Spanish cultural institutions there and the new regime.

His authority did not last. José Ibáñez Martín, the new education minister, and José María Albareda viewed his reorganization with suspicion, and Albareda's memoranda accused him of acting as a continuator of the Free Institution of Education, which the victors blamed for the country's "tragedy." The law creating the Spanish National Research Council (CSIC) was published in November 1939, and Albareda became its secretary instead of Palacios. In April 1940, the ministry ordered Palacios to hand over the former JAE services, and Franco inaugurated the CSIC in October 1940. In March 1945, he was one of several monarchist intellectuals who signed a letter to Infante Juan, Count of Barcelona in support of the Lausanne Manifesto. The regime dismissed him from his remaining posts, including the vice-rectorship, and confined him to Almansa. (Note: Fernández Terán and González Redondo date this episode to March 1944, while the chronology by González de Posada and colleagues dates it to 1945, the year of the manifesto.)

=== Lisbon and later career ===
After his return to the university, Palacios lived between Madrid and Lisbon from 1947 to 1961, in what Fernández Terán and González Redondo call a semi-exile that the Spanish authorities tolerated. At the invitation of the Portuguese Institute for High Culture, he taught physics at the University of Lisbon and directed its Center for Physics Studies. He also directed the radiation metrology section of the Portuguese Institute of Oncology, a laboratory for applications of radioactive isotopes, and a laboratory of atomic physics for Portugal's nuclear energy commission. During this period, his research interests turned to biology from the viewpoint of physics, and he spent much of his effort on writing books.

In 1952, Palacios became president of the Spanish committee of the International Union of Pure and Applied Physics, and on December 13, 1953, he became a member of the Royal Spanish Academy. He was elected to the science academies of Barcelona, Zaragoza, Buenos Aires, Córdoba, Argentina, Lisbon, Lima, Coimbra, and San Juan, Puerto Rico, between 1940 and 1942, and he belonged to the Royal National Academy of Medicine, where he held seat 20. He was vice-president of the Royal Academy of Sciences from 1958 and its president, elected unanimously, from March 30, 1966. In 1961, Juan de Borbón named him to his privy council, and González de Posada describes him as director of studies for the future king Juan Carlos I. He was named rector of the International Centre for Mechanical Sciences in Udine, which he had helped to found, in 1968. (Note: Oliva places this role at an international physics center in Trieste, but the chronology by González de Posada and colleagues identify it as the Udine center.)

=== Writing ===
Oliva counts 14 scientific books and 163 scientific papers by Palacios, along with about thirty articles in the newspaper ABC between 1955 and 1968. His textbooks, including Mecánica física, Electricidad y magnetismo, and Termodinámica aplicada, were studied by several generations of Spanish scientists. His Análisis dimensional (1956) appeared in French in 1960 and in English in 1964, which Soler Ferrán calls exceptional for a Spanish scientist of the period. In 1922 he had translated works by Max Planck, Fritz Reiche, and Eichwald and Fodor from German into Spanish.

=== Criticism of relativity ===
Palacios presented relativity in the orthodox way in his university textbooks of the 1940s, but from the middle of the 1950s he began to criticize Einstein's theory. The first sign was an article for the journal Physicalia on Einstein's death in 1955, and in 1960 he set out an alternative in the book Relatividad: una nueva teoría. His theory kept absolute space and time, and he later came to call it "antirelativist." Palacios held that the Lorentz transformations led to a logical inconsistency over the clock paradox and dropped the axiom of equivalence between inertial frames. Soler Ferrán, a historian of Spanish physics, writes that this reading of the Lorentz transformations was mistaken.

In 1962, Palacios seized on an interference experiment by the American physicist William Kantor, whose first results seemed to show that the speed of light depended on its source, and wrote an ABC article titled "El hundimiento de una teoría." Several Spanish scientists answered him, among them the mathematician José Gallego-Díaz in ABC, the young physicist Luis Ruiz de Gopegui, and the theoretical physicist Ramón Ortiz Fornaguera, whose exchange with Palacios in the Royal Academy of Sciences' journal in 1964 and 1965 was the only public debate on relativity among Spanish scientists in a specialist journal. Experiments published in 1963 and 1964 supported the constancy of the speed of light, and Soler Ferrán notes that Palacios did not discuss them. Soler Ferrán concludes that most Spanish physicists of the time accepted Einstein's theory and largely ignored Palacios's alternative, while continuing to hold him in high regard as a scientist and teacher.

== Personal life ==
Palacios married Elena Calleya Pedroso at the parish of São Sebastião da Pedreira in Lisbon. They had five daughters: Elena, Carmen, Pilar, Ana María, and María del Rosario. Calleya later wrote a biographical and scientific sketch of her husband, published in 1985. He died in Madrid on February 21, 1970, at the age of 78.

== Awards ==
- Honorary doctorate from the University of Toulouse (1943)
- Science prize of the Juan March Foundation (1958)
- Gold Medal of Merit in Labour (1969)
- Grand Cross of the Order of Saint James of the Sword, Portugal (1970, posthumous)
- Grand Cross and Collar of the Order of Charles III (1982, posthumous)

== Legacy ==
In 1982, the Santillana Foundation and the Aula de Cultura Científica organized a tribute in Santillana del Mar, with what its organizers called the first monographic exhibition on a Spanish physicist. Infante Juan, Count of Barcelona presented the Grand Cross of the Order of Charles III at its opening.

His personal library is held in Arrecife by the Cabildo of Lanzarote, although most of his scientific correspondence is in a private deposit. A memorial plaque stands at the Rocasolano Institute of Physical Chemistry, which occupies the former Rockefeller building. In his 2013 article Oliva proposed a Julio Palacios Chair to promote public understanding of science, and the institute now maintains a website for a chair of that name that publishes documents from the family's archive.

== Selected works ==
- Mecánica física. Madrid: Espasa-Calpe, 1942.
- Física para médicos. Madrid: Espasa-Calpe, 1942.
- Electricidad y magnetismo. Madrid: Espasa-Calpe, 1945.
- Física nuclear (de Leucipo a la bomba atómica). Valencia: La Enciclopedia Hispánica, 1946.
- Termodinámica aplicada. Madrid: Espasa-Calpe, 1947.
- Termodinámica y mecánica estadística. Madrid: Espasa-Calpe, 1948.
- Análisis dimensional. Madrid: Espasa-Calpe, 1956. French edition: Analyse dimensionnelle, Paris: Gauthier-Villars, 1960. English edition: Dimensional Analysis, London: Macmillan, 1964.
- Relatividad: una nueva teoría. Madrid: Espasa-Calpe, 1960.

== Works cited ==
- Oliva, Josep Maria (2013). "Julio Palacios Martínez (1891-1970): Un científico entre la física y la química" [Julio Palacios Martínez (1891-1970): A scientist between physics and chemistry] (PDF). Anales de Química (in Spanish). 109 (2). Real Sociedad Española de Química: 106–109.
- González de Posada, Francisco; Redondo, M. D.; González San José, M. A. (1984). "Cronología biográfica de Julio Palacios" [Biographical chronology of Julio Palacios] (PDF). Actas del II Congreso de la Sociedad Española de Historia de las Ciencias (in Spanish). Vol. 2. Zaragoza. pp. 167–173.
- Fernández Terán, Rosario E.; González Redondo, Francisco A. (2016). "Entre José Castillejo y José M.ª Albareda: Julio Palacios, el «último presidente» de la Junta para Ampliación de Estudios, 1939-1940" [Between José Castillejo and José M.ª Albareda: Julio Palacios, the "last president" of the Board for Advanced Studies, 1939-1940]. Historia de la Educación (in Spanish). 35: 293–320. doi:10.14201/hedu201635293320.
- Soler Ferrán, Pablo (2012). "La teoría de la relatividad en España: el debate en torno a la constancia de la velocidad de la luz y su base experimental en los años 1960" [The theory of relativity in Spain: the debate over the constancy of the speed of light and its experimental basis in the 1960s] (PDF). Llull (in Spanish). 35 (76): 381–401. ISSN 0210-8615.
