= Relative atomic mass =

Type of atomic measurement

Relative atomic mass (symbol: A_{r}; sometimes abbreviated RAM or r.a.m.), also known by the deprecated synonym atomic weight, is a dimensionless physical quantity defined as the ratio of the average mass of atoms of a chemical element in a given sample to the atomic mass constant. The atomic mass constant (symbol: m_{u}) is defined as being 1/12 of the mass of a carbon-12 atom. Since both quantities in the ratio are masses, the resulting value is dimensionless. These definitions remain valid even after the 2019 revision of the SI. (Note: There are only two consequences of the revision that are relevant to the present article. First, the molar mass of carbon-12, M(^{12}C), is no longer defined as exactly equal to 12 g/mol, but instead has to be determined experimentally and thus has an uncertainty. Its current best value is 12.0000000126(37) g/mol. Here the "(37)" is a measure of the uncertainty; basically, the "26" (the last two digits in 12.0000000126) should be understood as "26 ± 37", as explained at Uncertainty § In measurements. However, this is so close to the old value of 12 g/mol (the relative difference is 1.05×10^{−9}) that, in a vast majority of applications, M(^{12}C) may still be taken to be exactly 12 g/mol; this is of course so by design. Second, the Avogadro constant N_{A} is now exactly equal to 6.02214076×10^{23} reciprocal moles by definition, whereas previously it had to be determined experimentally and thus had an uncertainty.) (Note: Immediately following the 2019 revision, M(^{12}C) was equal to 12.0000000000(54) g/mol, corresponding to a relative standard uncertainty of 4.5×10^{−10}. This uncertainty was "inherited" from the relative standard uncertainty that the product hN_{A} had immediately prior to the revision: also 4.5×10^{−10}. (Here h is the Planck constant. Following the revisition, the product hN_{A} has an exact value by definition.) Conversely, immediately prior to the revision, the Avogadro constant N_{A} had a measured value of 6.022140758(62)×10^{23} reciprocal moles, corresponding to a relative standard uncertainty of 1.0×10^{−8}. Note that immediately prior to the revision, the product hN_{A} was known far more precisely than either h or N_{A} individually.)

For a single given sample, the relative atomic mass of a given element is the weighted arithmetic mean of the masses of the individual atoms (including all its isotopes) that are present in the sample. This quantity can vary significantly between samples because the sample's origin (and therefore its radioactive history or diffusion history) may have produced combinations of isotopic abundances in varying ratios. For example, due to a different mixture of stable carbon-12 and carbon-13 isotopes, a sample of elemental carbon from volcanic methane will have a different relative atomic mass than one collected from plant or animal tissues.

The more common, and more specific quantity known as standard atomic weight (A_{r}°) is an application of the relative atomic mass values obtained from many different samples. It is sometimes interpreted as the expected range of the relative atomic mass values for the atoms of a given element from all terrestrial sources, with the various sources being taken from Earth. "Atomic weight" is often loosely and incorrectly used as a synonym for standard atomic weight (incorrectly because standard atomic weights are not from a single sample). Standard atomic weight is nevertheless the most widely published variant of relative atomic mass.

Additionally, the continued use of the term "atomic weight" (for any element) as opposed to "relative atomic mass" has attracted considerable controversy since at least the 1960s, mainly due to the technical difference between weight and mass in physics. Still, both terms are officially sanctioned by the IUPAC. The term "relative atomic mass" now seems to be replacing "atomic weight" as the preferred term, although the term "standard atomic weight" (as opposed to the more correct "standard relative atomic mass") continues to be used.

== Definition ==
Relative atomic mass is determined by the average atomic mass, or the weighted mean of the atomic masses of all the atoms of a particular chemical element found in a particular sample, which is then compared to the atomic mass of carbon-12. This comparison is the quotient of the two weights, which makes the value dimensionless (having no unit). This quotient also explains the word relative: the sample mass value is considered relative to that of carbon-12.

It is a synonym for atomic weight, though it is not to be confused with relative isotopic mass. Relative atomic mass is also frequently used as a synonym for standard atomic weight and these quantities may have overlapping values if the relative atomic mass used is that for an element from Earth under defined conditions. However, relative atomic mass (atomic weight) is still technically distinct from standard atomic weight because of its application only to the atoms obtained from a single sample; it is also not restricted to terrestrial samples, whereas standard atomic weight averages multiple samples but only from terrestrial sources. Relative atomic mass is therefore a more general term that can more broadly refer to samples taken from non-terrestrial environments or highly specific terrestrial environments which may differ substantially from Earth-average or reflect different degrees of certainty (e.g., in number of significant figures) than those reflected in standard atomic weights.

=== Current definition ===
The prevailing IUPAC definitions (as taken from the "Gold Book") are:

atomic weight – See: relative atomic mass

and

relative atomic mass (atomic weight) – The ratio of the average mass of the atom to the atomic mass constant.

Here the atomic mass constant refers to 1/12 of the mass of an atom of ^{12}C in its ground state, and is equal to one dalton.

The IUPAC definition of relative atomic mass is:

An atomic weight (relative atomic mass) of an element from a specified source is the ratio of the average mass per atom of the element to 1/12 of the mass of an atom of ^{12}C.

The definition deliberately specifies "An atomic weight ...", as an element will have different relative atomic masses depending on the source. For example, boron from Turkey has a lower relative atomic mass than boron from California, because of its different isotopic composition. Nevertheless, given the cost and difficulty of isotope analysis, it is common practice to instead substitute the tabulated values of standard atomic weights, which are ubiquitous in chemical laboratories and which are revised biennially by the IUPAC's Commission on Isotopic Abundances and Atomic Weights (CIAAW).

=== Historical usage ===
Older (pre-1961) historical relative scales based on the atomic mass unit (symbol: a.m.u. or amu) used either the oxygen-16 relative isotopic mass or else the oxygen relative atomic mass (i.e., atomic weight) for reference. See the article on the history of the modern dalton for the resolution of these problems.

== Standard atomic weight ==
The IUPAC commission CIAAW maintains an expectation-interval value for relative atomic mass (or atomic weight) on Earth named standard atomic weight. Standard atomic weight requires the sources be terrestrial, natural, and stable with regard to radioactivity. Also, there are requirements for the research process. For 84 stable elements, CIAAW has determined this standard atomic weight. These values are widely published and referred to loosely as 'the' atomic weight of elements for real-life substances like pharmaceuticals and commercial trade.

Also, CIAAW has published abridged (rounded) values and simplified values (for when the Earthly sources vary systematically).

== Other measures of the mass of atoms ==
Atomic mass (m_{a}) is the mass of a single atom. It defines the mass of a specific isotope, which is an input value for the determination of the relative atomic mass. An example for three silicon isotopes is given below. A convenient unit of mass for atomic mass is the dalton (Da), which is also called the unified atomic mass unit (u).

The relative isotopic mass is the ratio of the mass of a single atom to the atomic mass constant (m_{u} = 1 Da). This ratio is dimensionless.

== Determination of relative atomic mass ==
Modern relative atomic masses (a term specific to a given element sample) are calculated from measured values of atomic mass (for each nuclide) and isotopic composition of a sample. Highly accurate atomic masses are available for virtually all non-radioactive nuclides, but isotopic compositions are both harder to measure to high precision and more subject to variation between samples. For this reason, the relative atomic masses of the 22 mononuclidic elements (which are the same as the isotopic masses for each of the single naturally occurring nuclides of these elements) are known to especially high accuracy. For example, there is an uncertainty of only one part in 38 million for the relative atomic mass of fluorine, a precision which is greater than the current best value for the Avogadro constant (one part in 20 million).

Isotope	Atomic mass	Abundance	
Isotope	Atomic mass	Standard	Range
^{28}Si	27.97692653246(194)	92.2297(7)%	92.21–92.25%
^{29}Si	28.976494700(22)	4.6832(5)%	4.67–4.69%
^{30}Si	29.973770171(32)	3.0872(5)%	3.08–3.10%

The calculation is exemplified for silicon, whose relative atomic mass is especially important in metrology. Silicon exists in nature as a mixture of three isotopes: ^{28}Si, ^{29}Si and ^{30}Si. The atomic masses of these nuclides are known to a precision of one part in 14 billion for ^{28}Si and about one part in one billion for the others. However, the range of natural abundance for the isotopes is such that the standard abundance can only be given to about ±0.001% (see table).

The calculation is as follows:

A_{r}(Si) = (27.97693 × 0.922297) + (28.97649 × 0.046832) + (29.97377 × 0.030872) = 28.0854

The estimation of the uncertainty is complicated, especially as the sample distribution is not necessarily symmetrical: the IUPAC standard relative atomic masses are quoted with estimated symmetrical uncertainties, and the value for silicon is 28.0855(3). The relative standard uncertainty in this value is 10^{−5} or 10 ppm.

Apart from this uncertainty by measurement, some elements have variation over sources. That is, different sources (ocean water, rocks) have a different radioactive history and so different isotopic composition. To reflect this natural variability, the IUPAC made the decision in 2010 to list the standard relative atomic masses of 10 elements as an interval rather than a fixed number.

== See also ==
- International Union of Pure and Applied Chemistry (IUPAC)
- Commission on Isotopic Abundances and Atomic Weights (CIAAW)
