= History of atomic theory =

The current theoretical model of the atom involves a dense nucleus surrounded by a probabilistic "cloud" of electrons

Atomic theory is the scientific theory that matter is composed of particles called atoms. The definition of the word "atom" has changed over the years in response to scientific discoveries. Initially, it referred to a hypothetical fundamental particle of matter, too small to be seen by the naked eye, that could not be divided. Then the definition was refined to being the basic particles of the chemical elements, when chemists observed that elements seemed to combine with each other in ratios of small whole numbers. Then physicists discovered that these atoms had an internal structure of their own and therefore could be divided after all.

Atomic theory is one of the most important scientific developments in history, crucial to all the physical sciences. At the start of The Feynman Lectures on Physics, physicist and Nobel laureate Richard Feynman offers the atomic hypothesis as the single most prolific scientific concept.

== Philosophical atomism ==
The basic idea that matter is made up of tiny indivisible particles is an old idea that appeared in many ancient cultures. The word "atom" comes from the Greek word "atomos", meaning "indivisible". These ancient ideas were based in philosophical reasoning rather than scientific reasoning. Modern atomic theory is not based on these old concepts.

== Pre-atomic chemistry ==
Working in the late 17th century, Robert Boyle developed the concept of a chemical element as substance different from a compound. Near the end of the 18th century, a number of important developments in chemistry emerged without referring to the notion of an atomic theory. The first was Antoine Lavoisier who showed that compounds consist of elements in constant proportion, redefining an element as a substance which scientists could not decompose into simpler substances by experimentation. This brought an end to the ancient idea of the elements of matter being fire, earth, air, and water, which had no experimental support. Lavoisier showed that water can be decomposed into hydrogen and oxygen, which in turn he could not decompose into anything simpler, thereby proving these are elements. Lavoisier also defined the law of conservation of mass, which states that in a chemical reaction, matter does not appear nor disappear into thin air; the total mass remains the same even if the substances involved were transformed. In 1797 the French chemist Joseph Proust established the law of definite proportions, which states that if a compound is broken down into its constituent chemical elements, then the masses of those constituents will always have the same proportions by weight, regardless of the quantity or source of the original compound. This definition distinguished compounds from mixtures.

== Dalton's chemical atomism ==
In 1804, John Dalton studied data gathered by himself and by other scientists and noticed a pattern that later came to be known as the law of multiple proportions: in compounds which contain two particular elements, the amount of Element A per measure of Element B will differ across these compounds by ratios of small whole numbers. For instance, Dalton investigated three oxides of nitrogen: "nitrous oxide", "nitrous gas", and "nitric acid". These compounds are known today as nitrous oxide, nitric oxide, and nitrogen dioxide respectively. "Nitrous oxide" is 63.3% nitrogen and 36.7% oxygen, which means it has 80 g of oxygen for every 140 g of nitrogen. "Nitrous gas" is 44.05% nitrogen and 55.95% oxygen, which means there are 160 g of oxygen for every 140 g of nitrogen. "Nitric acid" is 29.5% nitrogen and 70.5% oxygen, which means it has 320 g of oxygen for every 140 g of nitrogen. 80, 160, and 320 form a ratio of 1:2:4.

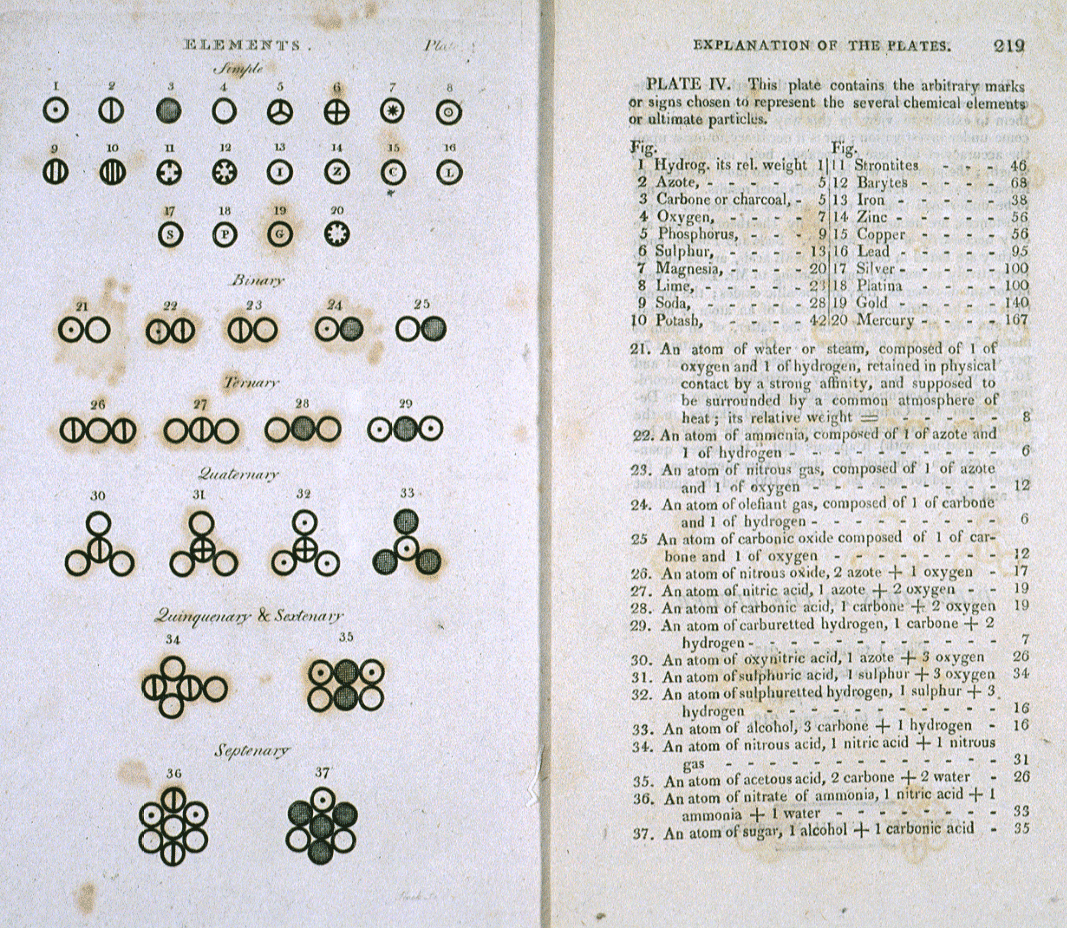
From A New System of Chemical Philosophy (John Dalton 1808); Dalton's symbols were integral to his theory.

John Dalton saw this as evidence that the chemical elements combine with each other by basic units of weight. The basic units were indivisible as far as he could tell, so he concluded he had discovered the atoms that chemists and philosophers had long hypothesized. Given a ratio of 1:2:4, Dalton deduced that the formulas for the oxides of nitrogen are N_{2}O, NO, and NO_{2}.

In 1804, Dalton explained his atomic theory to his friend and fellow chemist Thomas Thomson, who published the first full explanation in his book A System of Chemistry in 1807. Dalton's own version appeared in 1808 under the title A New System of Chemical Philosophy and adopted with word atom to refer to objects he previous called ultimate particles. This new chemical atomic theory proposed atoms with scientific properties: all atoms of an element have the same weight; atoms of different elements have different weights. No atoms are created or destroyed in chemical reactions. Dalton was able to use his concept of atoms to reproduce the then known laws of chemistry.

Dalton defined an atom as being the "ultimate particle" of a chemical substance, and he used the term "compound atom" to refer to "ultimate particles" which contain two or more elements. This is inconsistent with the modern definition, wherein an atom is the basic particle of a chemical element and a molecule is an agglomeration of atoms. The term "compound atom" was confusing to some of Dalton's contemporaries as the word "atom" implies indivisibility, but he responded that if a carbon dioxide "atom" is divided, it ceases to be carbon dioxide. The carbon dioxide "atom" is indivisible in the sense that it cannot be divided into smaller carbon dioxide particles.

Dalton's system was based on relative weights. By his measurements, 7 grams of oxygen will combine with 1 gram of hydrogen to make 8 grams of water. Dalton considered water to be a "binary atom", with one oxygen atom and one hydrogen atom, HO. He also considered hydrogen gas to be elemental, given an atomic weight of 1. Thus the 1:7 measured ratio means oxygen gets an atomic weight of 7 in Dalton's system. However, if Dalton had analyzed hydrogen peroxide, H_{2}O_{2}, instead of water he would have assigned oxygen an atomic weight of 16. Thus Dalton's relative weight system was fundamentally insufficient to determine unambiguous atomic weight or chemical structures.

Some of the problems in Dalton's method were corrected by Joseph-Louis Gay-Lussac and Amedeo Avogadro. They developed ratio laws for gases similar to the laws developed for chemicals by Proust and Dalton. In 1811, Avogadro proposed that equal volumes of any two gases, at equal temperature and pressure, contain equal numbers of molecules (in other words, the mass of a gas's particles does not affect the volume that it occupies). Avogadro's hypothesis, now usually called Avogadro's law, provided a method for deducing the relative weights of the molecules of gaseous elements, for if the hypothesis is correct relative gas densities directly indicate the relative weights of the particles that compose the gases. This way of thinking led directly to a second hypothesis: the particles of certain elemental gases were pairs of atoms, and when reacting chemically these molecules often split in two. For instance, the fact that two liters of hydrogen will react with just one liter of oxygen to produce two liters of water vapor (at constant pressure and temperature) suggested that a single oxygen molecule splits in two in order to form two molecules of water. This give the correct formula of water, H_{2}O, not HO. Avogadro measured oxygen's atomic weight to be 15.074.

== Opposition to atomic theory ==
Dalton's atomic theory attracted widespread interest but not universal acceptance.

One problem was the lack of uniform nomenclature. The word "atom" implied indivisibility, but Dalton defined an atom as being the ultimate particle of any chemical substance, not just the elements or even matter per se. This meant that "compound atoms" such as carbon dioxide could be divided, as opposed to "elementary atoms". Dalton disliked the word "molecule", regarding it as "diminutive". Amedeo Avogadro did the opposite: he exclusively used the word "molecule" in his writings, eschewing the word "atom", instead using the term "elementary molecule". Jöns Jacob Berzelius used the term "organic atoms" to refer to particles containing three or more elements, because he thought this only existed in organic compounds. Jean-Baptiste Dumas used the terms "physical atoms" and "chemical atoms"; a "physical atom" was a particle that cannot be divided by physical means such as temperature and pressure, and a "chemical atom" was a particle that could not be divided by chemical reactions.

The modern definitions of atom and molecule—an atom being the basic particle of an element, and a molecule being an agglomeration of atoms—were established in the latter half of the 19th century. A key event was the Karlsruhe Congress in Germany in 1860. As the first international congress of chemists, its goal was to establish some standards in the community. A major proponent of the modern distinction between atoms and molecules was Stanislao Cannizzaro.

The various quantities of a particular element involved in the constitution of different molecules are integral multiples of a fundamental quantity that always manifests itself as an indivisible entity and which must properly be named atom.

— Stanislao Cannizzaro, 1860

A second objection to atomic theory was philosophical. Scientists in the 19th century had no way of directly observing atoms. They inferred the existence of atoms through indirect observations, such as Dalton's law of multiple proportions. Some scientists adopted positions aligned with the philosophy of positivism, arguing that scientists should not attempt to deduce the deeper reality of the universe, but only systemize what patterns they could directly observe.

This generation of anti-atomists can be grouped in two camps. The "equivalentists", like Marcellin Berthelot, believed the theory of equivalent weights was adequate for scientific purposes. This generalization of Proust's law of definite proportions summarized observations. For example, 1 gram of hydrogen will combine with 8 grams of oxygen to form 9 grams of water, therefore the "equivalent weight" of oxygen is 8 grams. These ideas where widely used by chemists without accepting an underlying atomic explanation. The "energeticists", like Ernst Mach and Wilhelm Ostwald, were philosophically opposed to hypothesis about reality altogether. In their view, only energy as part of thermodynamics should be the basis of physical models.

These positions were eventually quashed by two important advancements that happened later in the 19th century: the development of the periodic table and the discovery that molecules have an internal architecture that determines their properties.

== Prout's hypothesis ==
Dalton's atoms were "elementary": each element had a unique atomic weight and all atoms of the element were identical. In 1815 William Prout speculated that the whole-number ratios that appear in the atomic weights results from an underlying reality that all matter was composed of combinations of a primitive element he called a protyle and which he identified with hydrogen. Berzelius, the leading expert on atomic weight, objected that careful measurements show the atomic weights are not whole-number ratios. Thus Prout's hypothesis was rejected in favor of Dalton's at the time, but Prout's idea continued to intrigue scientists and his conjecture would be partly verified by Francis Aston in 1912.

== Vortex theory ==
From the 1860s to around 1890 a theory originally proposed by William Thomson and expanded by and JJ Thomson viewed atoms as vortices in a pervasive continuous fluid medium. The idea was to view matter as stable rotations in the frictionless fluid akin to smoke rings which were used to visually illustrate the concept. The mathematical formulation built on the vortex hydrodynamics theory of Hermann von Helmholtz even though he was not a supporter of this atomic theory. The theory overlapped the rise of the theory of luminiferous aether in concept and in time frame but the two theories were not identical. While the theory had a significant impact on mathematics, inspiring the theory of knots for example, its own advocates eventually concluded that the vortices were not stable and furthermore the theory offered no account of phenomena such as magnetism and gravitation.

== Isomerism ==
Scientists discovered some substances have the exact same chemical content but different properties. For instance, in 1827, Friedrich Wöhler discovered that silver fulminate and silver cyanate are both 107 parts silver, 12 parts carbon, 14 parts nitrogen, and 16 parts oxygen (we now know their formulas as both AgCNO). In 1830 Jöns Jacob Berzelius introduced the term isomerism to describe the phenomenon. In 1860, Louis Pasteur hypothesized that the molecules of isomers might have the same set of atoms but in different arrangements.

In 1874, Jacobus Henricus van 't Hoff proposed that the carbon atom bonds to other atoms in a tetrahedral arrangement. Working from this, he explained the structures of organic molecules in such a way that he could predict how many isomers a compound could have. Consider, for example, pentane (C_{5}H_{12}). In van 't Hoff's way of modelling molecules, there are three possible configurations for pentane, and scientists did go on to discover three and only three isomers of pentane.

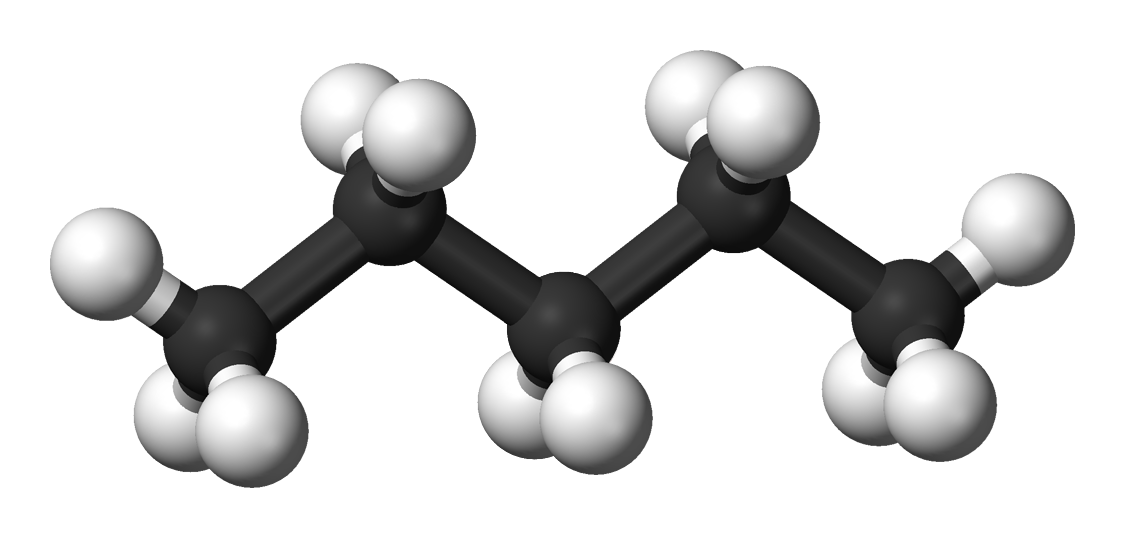
n-pentane

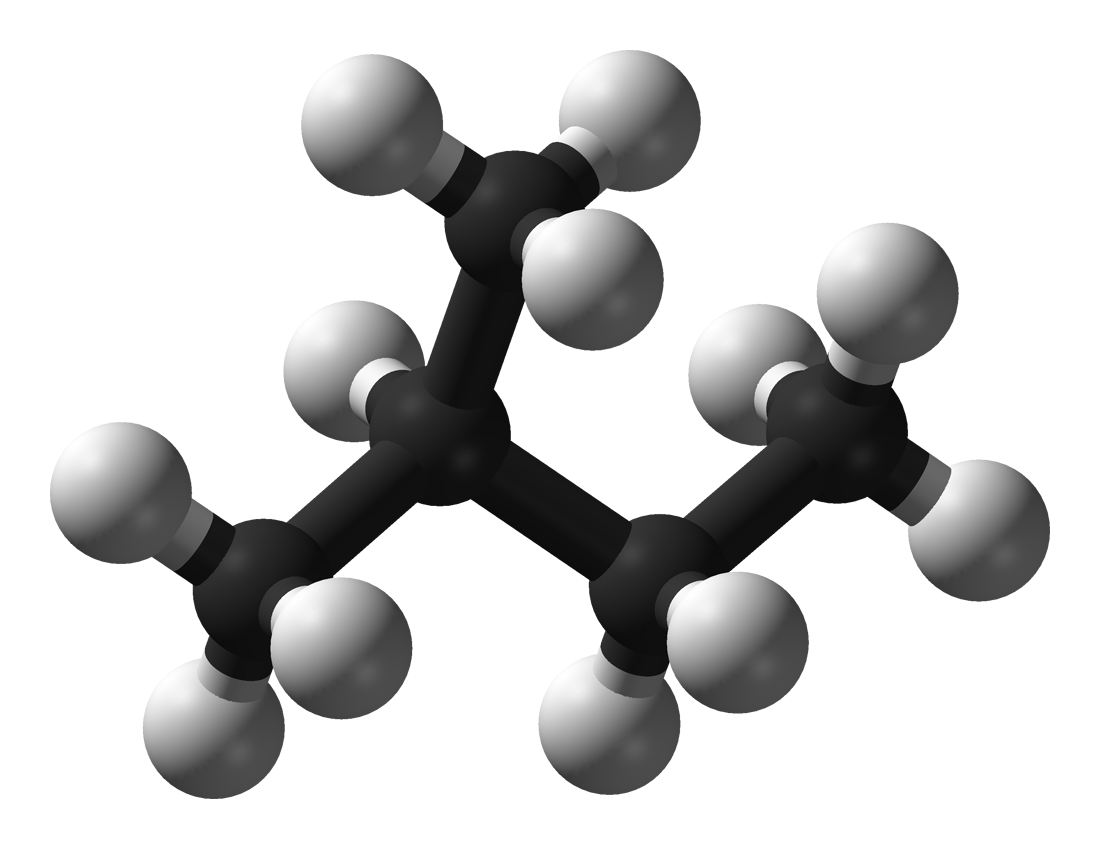
isopentane

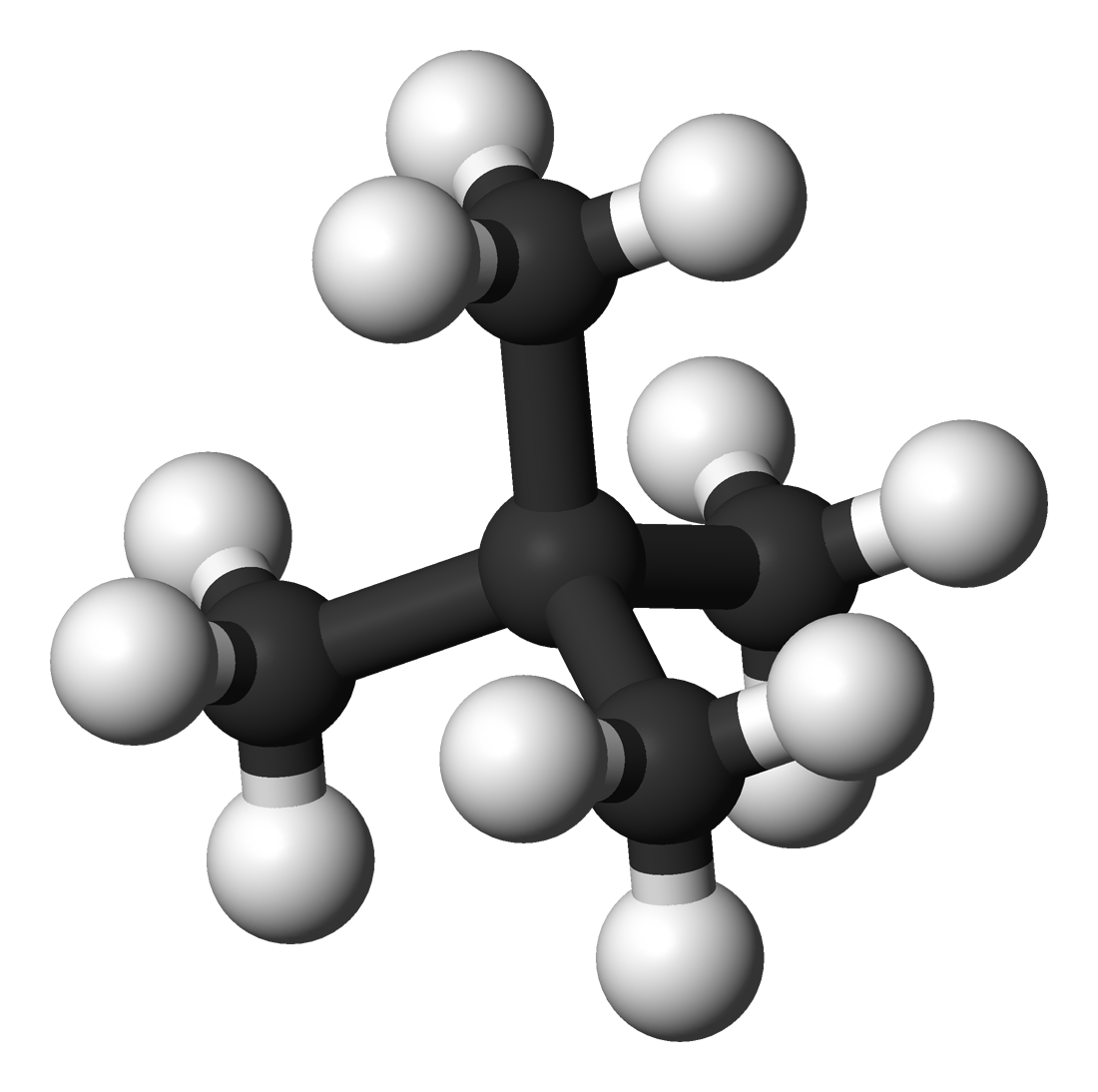
neopentane

Jacobus Henricus van 't Hoff's way of modelling molecular structures correctly predicted the three isomers of pentane (C_{5}H_{12}).

Isomerism was not something that could be fully explained by alternative theories to atomic theory, such as radical theory and the theory of types.

== Mendeleev's periodic table ==
In 1869 Dmitrii Mendeleev reported that when he arranged the elements in a row according to their atomic weights, there was a certain periodicity to them. For instance, the second element, lithium, had similar properties to the ninth element, sodium, and the sixteenth element, potassium — a period of seven. Likewise, beryllium, magnesium, and calcium were similar and all were seven places apart from each other on Mendeleev's table. Using these patterns, Mendeleev predicted the existence and properties of new elements, which were later discovered in nature: scandium, gallium, and germanium. Moreover, the periodic table could predict how many atoms of other elements that an atom could bond with — e.g., germanium and carbon are in the same group on the table and their atoms both combine with two oxygen atoms each (GeO_{2} and CO_{2}). Mendeleev found these patterns validated atomic theory because it showed that the elements could be categorized by their atomic weight. Inserting a new element into the middle of a period would break the parallel between that period and the next, and would also violate Dalton's law of multiple proportions.

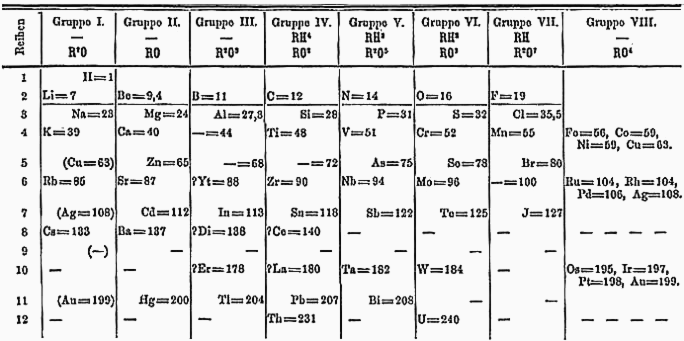
Mendeleev's periodic table from 1871.

The elements on the periodic table were originally arranged in order of increasing atomic weight. However, in a number of places chemists chose to swap the positions of certain adjacent elements so that they appeared in a group with other elements with similar properties. For instance, tellurium is placed before iodine even though tellurium is heavier (127.6 vs 126.9) so that iodine can be in the same column as the other halogens. The modern periodic table is based on atomic number, which is equivalent to the nuclear charge, a change that had to wait for the discovery of the nucleus. In addition, an entire row of the table was not shown because the noble gases had not been discovered when Mendeleev devised his table.

== Kinetic theory of gases ==
In 1738, Swiss physicist and mathematician Daniel Bernoulli postulated that the pressure of gases and heat were both caused by the underlying motion of molecules. Using his model he could predict the ideal gas law at constant temperature and suggested that the temperature was proportional to the velocity of the particles. This success was not followed up, in part because the then new tools of calculus allowed more progress using continuous models for gases.

James Clerk Maxwell, a vocal proponent of atomism, revived the kinetic theory in 1860 and 1867. His key insight was that the velocity of particles in a gas would vary around an average value, introducing the concept of a distribution function. In the late 1800s, Ludwig Boltzmann used atomic models to apply kinetic theory to thermodynamics especially the second law relating to entropy. Boltzmann defended the atomistic hypothesis against major detractors from the time like Ernst Mach or energeticists like Wilhelm Ostwald, who considered that energy was the elementary quantity of reality. However an atomic model was not essential for the development of theory of thermodynamics. This became clear when Josiah Willard Gibbs introduced statistical mechanics in his 1902 book Elementary Principles in Statistical Mechanics. His logical and formal development of a new approach specifically avoided requiring an atomic hypothesis. Albert Einstein independently developed an approach similar to Gibbs, but with a completely different aim: Einstein set out to find a way to verify the atomic hypothesis through the kinetic theory. He would eventually succeed with a paper on Brownian motion.

=== Brownian motion ===
In 1827, the British botanist Robert Brown observed that dust particles inside pollen grains floating in water constantly jiggled about for no apparent reason. In 1905, Einstein theorized that this motion was caused by the water molecules continuously knocking the grains about, and developed a mathematical model to describe it. This model was validated experimentally in 1908 by French physicist Jean Perrin, who used Einstein's equations to measure the size of atoms.

Kinetic diameters of simple molecules
Molecule	Perrin's 1909 measurements	Modern measurements	Source
Helium	1.7 × 10^{−10} m	2.6 × 10^{−10} m	
Argon	2.7 × 10^{−10} m	3.4 × 10^{−10} m	
Mercury	2.8 × 10^{−10} m	3 × 10^{−10} m	
Hydrogen	2 × 10^{−10} m	2.89 × 10^{−10} m	
Oxygen	2.6 × 10^{−10} m	3.46 × 10^{−10} m	
Nitrogen	2.7 × 10^{−10} m	3.64 × 10^{−10} m	
Chlorine	4 × 10^{−10} m	3.20 × 10^{−10} m	

== Plum pudding model ==
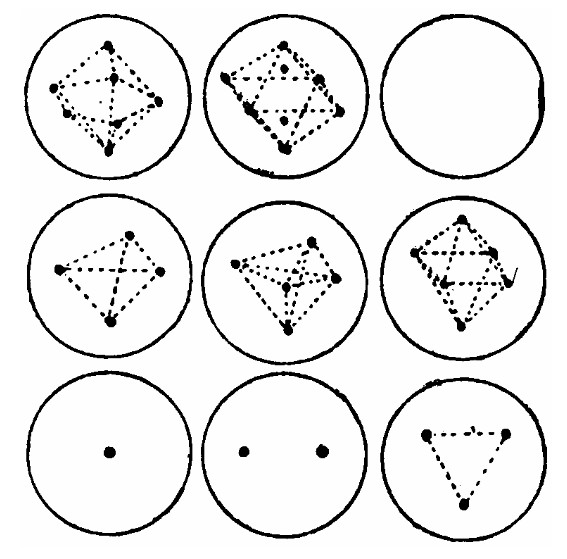
A 1905 diagram by J. J. Thomson illustrating his hypothesized arrangements of electrons in an atom, ranging from one to eight electrons.

The arrangement of seven electrons in a pentagonal dipyramid.

Atoms were thought to be the smallest possible division of matter until 1899 when J. J. Thomson discovered the electron through his work on cathode rays.

A Crookes tube is a sealed glass container in which two electrodes are separated by a vacuum. When a voltage is applied across the electrodes, cathode rays are generated, creating a glowing patch where they strike the glass at the opposite end of the tube. Through experimentation, Thomson discovered that the rays could be deflected by electric fields and magnetic fields, which meant that these rays were not a form of light but were composed of very light charged particles, and their charge was negative. Thomson called these particles "corpuscles". He measured their mass-to-charge ratio to be several orders of magnitude smaller than that of the hydrogen atom, the smallest atom. This ratio was the same regardless of what the electrodes were made of and what the trace gas in the tube was.

In contrast to those corpuscles, positive ions created by electrolysis or X-ray radiation had mass-to-charge ratios that varied depending on the material of the electrodes and the type of gas in the reaction chamber, indicating they were different kinds of particles.

In 1898, Thomson measured the charge on ions to be roughly 6 × 10^{−10} electrostatic units (2 × 10^{−19} Coulombs). In 1899, he showed that negative electricity created by ultraviolet light landing on a metal (known now as the photoelectric effect) has the same mass-to-charge ratio as cathode rays; then he applied his previous method for determining the charge on ions to the negative electric particles created by ultraviolet light. By this combination he showed that electron's mass was 0.0014 times that of hydrogen ions. These "corpuscles" were so light yet carried so much charge that Thomson concluded they must be the basic particles of electricity, and for that reason other scientists decided that these "corpuscles" should instead be called electrons following an 1894 suggestion by George Johnstone Stoney for naming the basic unit of electrical charge.

In 1904, Thomson published a paper describing a new model of the atom. Electrons reside within atoms, and they transplant themselves from one atom to the next in a chain in the action of an electrical current. When electrons do not flow, their negative charge logically must be balanced out by some source of positive charge within the atom so as to render the atom electrically neutral. Having no clue as to the source of this positive charge, Thomson tentatively proposed that the positive charge was everywhere in the atom, the atom being shaped like a sphere—this was the mathematically simplest model to fit the available evidence (or lack of it). The balance of electrostatic forces would distribute the electrons throughout this sphere in a more or less even manner. Thomson further explained that ions are atoms that have a surplus or shortage of electrons.

Thomson's model is popularly known as the plum pudding model, based on the idea that the electrons are distributed throughout the sphere of positive charge with the same density as raisins in a plum pudding. Neither Thomson nor his colleagues ever used this analogy. It seems to have been a conceit of popular science writers. The analogy suggests that the positive sphere is like a solid, but Thomson likened it to a jelly, as he proposed that the electrons moved around in it in patterns governed by the electrostatic forces. The positive electrification in Thomson's model was a temporary concept, which he hoped would ultimately be explained by some phenomena of the electrons. Like all atomic models of that time, Thomson's model was incomplete, it could not predict any of the known properties of the atom such as emission spectra.

In 1910, Robert A. Millikan and Harvey Fletcher reported the results of their oil drop experiment in which they isolated and measured the charge of an electron. Careful measurements over several years gave the charge -4.774 × 10^{−10}esu.

== Planetary models ==
In the late 1800s speculations on the possible structure of the atom included planetary models with orbiting charged electrons. These models faced a significant constraint. In 1897, Joseph Larmor showed that an accelerating charge would radiate power according to classical electrodynamics, a result known as the Larmor formula. Since electrons forced to remain in orbit are continuously accelerating, they would be mechanically unstable. Larmor noted that electromagnetic effect of multiple electrons, suitably arranged, would cancel each other. Thus subsequent atomic models based on classical electrodynamics needed to adopt such special multi-electron arrangements.

In 1903 Hantaro Nagaoka challenged Thomson's plum pudding model with a "Saturnian" model which featured a massive atomic center with a positive charge of 10,000 times the electron charge, surrounded by electrons in rings analogous to those of Saturn. The model was widely discussed, including a detailed study George Schott which claimed it failed to correctly predict atomic spectra. Nagaoka himself abandoned the proposal in 1908.

== Haas atomic model ==
In 1910, Arthur Erich Haas proposed a model of the hydrogen atom with an electron circulating on the surface of a sphere of positive charge. The model resembled Thomson's plum pudding model, but Haas added a radical new twist: he constrained the electron's potential energy, $E_\text{pot}$, on a sphere of radius a to equal the frequency, f, of the electron's orbit on the sphere times the Planck constant:
$$E_\text{pot}= \frac{- e^2}{a} = hf$$
where e represents the charge on the electron and the sphere. Haas combined this constraint with the balance-of-forces equation. The attractive force between the electron and the sphere balances the centrifugal force:
$$\frac{e^2}{a^2} = ma(2\pi f)^2$$
where m is the mass of the electron. This combination relates the radius of the sphere to the Planck constant:
$$a = \frac{h^2}{4\pi^2e^2m}$$
Haas solved for the Planck constant using the then-current value for the radius of the hydrogen atom. Three years later, Bohr would use similar equations with different interpretation. Bohr took the Planck constant as given value and used the equations to predict, a, the radius of the electron orbiting in the ground state of the hydrogen atom. This value is now called the Bohr radius.

== Nicholson atom theory ==
In 1911 John William Nicholson published a model of the atom based on classical electrodynamics along the lines of J.J. Thomson's plum pudding model but with the negative electrons orbiting a positive nucleus rather than circulating in a sphere. To avoid immediate collapse of this system he required that electrons come in pairs so the rotational acceleration of each electron was matched across the orbit.

Nicholson developed his model based on the analysis of astrophysical spectroscopy. He connected the observed spectral line frequencies with the orbits of electrons in his atoms. The connection he adopted associated the atomic electron orbital angular momentum with the Planck constant. Whereas Planck focused on a quantum of energy, Nicholson's angular momentum quantum relates to orbital frequency. This new concept gave Planck constant an atomic meaning for the first time.

Nicholson's model is rarely discussed today but it heavily influenced the important Bohr quantum atom model. Nicholson's spectral results were in good agreement with experiment, forcing Bohr to address these results in his subsequent theory. By 1913 Bohr had already shown, from the analysis of alpha particle energy loss, that hydrogen had only a single electron not a matched pair required by Nicholson's model. In his 1913 paper on atoms, Bohr cites Nicholson as finding quantized angular momentum important for the atom. Bohr quantization would associate emission with differences in the energy levels hydrogen rather than being directly related to the orbital frequency.

== Discovery of the nucleus ==
The Rutherford scattering experiments Left: Expected results: alpha particles passing through the plum pudding model of the atom with negligible deflection. Right: Observed results: a small portion of the particles were deflected by the concentrated positive charge of the nucleus.

Thomson's plum pudding model was challenged in 1911 by one of his former students, Ernest Rutherford, who presented a new model to explain new experimental data. The new model proposed a concentrated center of charge and mass that was later dubbed the atomic nucleus.

Ernest Rutherford and his colleagues Hans Geiger and Ernest Marsden came to have doubts about the Thomson model after they encountered difficulties when they tried to build an instrument to measure the charge-to-mass ratio of alpha particles (these are positively-charged particles emitted by certain radioactive substances such as radium). The alpha particles were being scattered by the air in the detection chamber, which made the measurements unreliable. Thomson had encountered a similar problem in his work on cathode rays, which he solved by creating a near-perfect vacuum in his instruments. Rutherford didn't think he'd run into this same problem because alpha particles usually have much more momentum than electrons. According to Thomson's model of the atom, the positive charge in the atom is not concentrated enough to produce an electric field strong enough to deflect an alpha particle. Yet there was scattering, so Rutherford and his colleagues decided to investigate this scattering carefully.

Between 1908 and 1913, Rutherford and his colleagues performed a series of experiments in which they bombarded thin foils of metal with a beam of alpha particles. They spotted alpha particles being deflected by angles greater than 90°. According to Thomson's model, all of the alpha particles should have passed through with negligible deflection. Rutherford deduced that the positive charge of the atom is not distributed throughout the atom's volume as Thomson believed, but is concentrated in a tiny nucleus at the center. This nucleus also carries most of the atom's mass. Only such an intense concentration of charge, anchored by its high mass, could produce an electric field strong enough to deflect the alpha particles as observed. Rutherford's model, being supported primarily by scattering data unfamiliar to many scientists, did not catch on until Niels Bohr joined Rutherford's lab and developed a new model for the electrons.

Rutherford model predicted that the scattering of alpha particles would be proportional to the square of the atomic charge. Geiger and Marsden's based their analysis on setting the charge to half of the atomic weight of the foil's material (gold, aluminium, etc.). Amateur physicist Antonius van den Broek noted that there was a more precise relation between the charge and the element's numeric sequence in the order of atomic weights. The sequence number came be called the atomic number and it replaced atomic weight in organizing the periodic table.

== Discovery of isotopes ==
Concurrent with the work of Rutherford, Geiger, and Marsden, the radiochemist Frederick Soddy at the University of Glasgow was studying chemistry-related problems on radioactive materials. Soddy had worked with Rutherford on radioactivity at McGill University. By 1910, about 40 different radioactive elements, referred to as radioelements, had been identified between uranium and lead, although the periodic table only allowed for 11 elements. Every attempt to chemically isolate the radioelements mesothorium or thorium X from radium failed. Soddy concluded that these substances were chemically the same element. At the suggestion of Margaret Todd, Soddy called these chemically identical elements isotopes. In 1913, Soddy and theorist Kazimierz Fajans independently found the displacement law, that an element undergoing alpha decay will produce an element two places to the left in the periodic system and an element undergoing beta decay will produce an element one place to the right in the periodic system. For his study of radioactivity and the discovery of isotopes, Soddy was awarded the 1921 Nobel Prize in Chemistry.

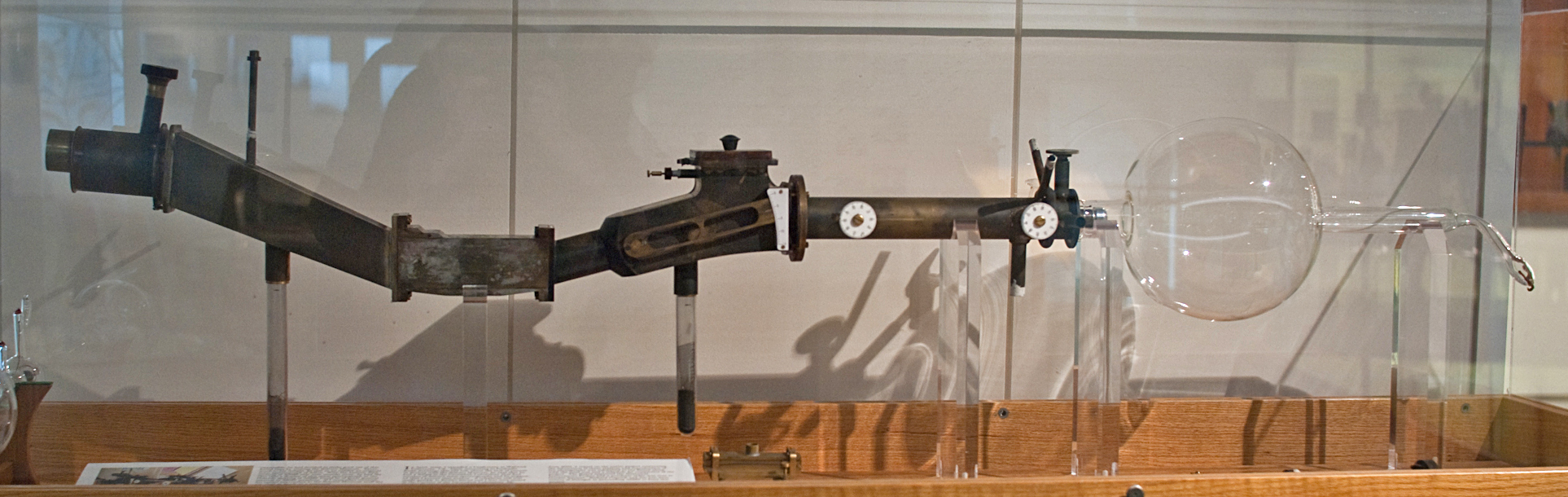
Replica of Aston's third mass spectrometer

Prior to 1919 only atomic weights averaged over a very large number of atoms was available. In that year, Francis Aston built the first mass spectrograph, an improved form of a device built by J. J. Thomson to measure the deflection of positively charged atoms by electric and magnetic fields. Aston was then able to separate the isotopes of many light elements including neon, ^{20}Ne and ^{22}Ne. Aston discovered the isotopes matched William Prout's whole number rule: the mass of every isotope is a whole number multiple of hydrogen.

Significantly, the one exception to this whole number rule was hydrogen itself, which had a mass value of 1.008. The excess mass was small, but well outside the limits of experimental uncertainty. Aston and others realized this difference was due to the binding energy of atoms. When a number of hydrogen atoms are bound into an atom, that atom's energy must be less than the sum of the energies of the separate hydrogen atoms. That lost energy, according to the mass-energy equivalence principle, means the atomic mass will be slightly less than the sum of the masses of its components. Aston's work on isotopes won him the 1922 Nobel Prize in Chemistry for the discovery of isotopes in a large number of non-radioactive elements, and for his enunciation of the whole number rule.

== Atomic number ==
Before 1913, chemists adhered to Mendeleev's principle that chemical properties derived from atomic weight. However, several places in the periodic table were inconsistent with this concept. For example cobalt and nickel seemed reversed. There were also attempts to understand the relationship between the atomic mass and nuclear charge. Rutherford knew from experiments in his lab that helium must have a nuclear charge of 2 and a mass of 4; this 1:2 ratio was expected to hold for all elements. In 1913 Antonius van den Broek hypothesized that the periodic table should be organized by charge, denoted by Z, not atomic mass and that Z was not exactly half of the atomic weight for elements. This solved the cobalt-nickel issue. Placing cobalt (Z=27, mass of 58.97), before the heavier nickel (Z=28, mass of 58.68) gave the ordering expected by chemical behavior.

In 1913–1914 Moseley tested Broek's hypothesis experimentally by using X-ray spectroscopy. He found that the most intense short-wavelength line in the X-ray spectrum of a particular element, known as the K-alpha line, was related to the element's charge its atomic number, Z. Moseley found that the frequencies of the radiation were related in a simple way to the atomic number of the elements for a large number of elements.

== Bohr model ==
The Bohr model of the atom

Rutherford deduced the existence of the atomic nucleus through his experiments but he had nothing to say about how the electrons were arranged around it. In 1912, Niels Bohr joined Rutherford's lab and began his work on a quantum model of the atom.

Max Planck in 1900 and Albert Einstein in 1905 had postulated that light energy is emitted or absorbed in discrete amounts known as quanta (singular, quantum). This led to a series of atomic models with some quantum aspects, such as that of Arthur Erich Haas in 1910 and the 1912 John William Nicholson atomic model with quantized angular momentum as h/2π. Critically, Nicholson successfully reproduces atomic spectral lines, a challenge that Bohr's model would also need to overcome. When Bohr learned from a friend about Balmer's compact formula for the spectral line data, Bohr quickly realized his model would match it in detail.

In 1913, Bohr published a trilogy of papers developing his model of the atom based on two hypothesis: 1) an electron could change states only by "quantum leaps" and 2) the jump corresponds to a emission of light according to Planck relation. With these assumptions, the instability of the older models becomes irrelevant and the classical electrodynamics of Maxwell is considered invalid. Using circular orbits for simplicity, Bohr could then derived Balmer's spectral formula. Balmer's formula contained a constant now known as the Rydberg constant with a value known only by matching experimental results. Bohr provided a derivation based on an atomic model, a result taken as substantial evidence in favor of his model. Bohr also used he model to describe the structure of the periodic table and aspects of chemical bonding. Together these results lead to Bohr's model being widely accepted by the end of 1915.

Bohr's model was not perfect. It could only predict the spectral lines of hydrogen, not those of multielectron atoms. Worse still, it could not even account for all features of the hydrogen spectrum: as spectrographic technology improved, it was discovered that applying a magnetic field caused spectral lines to multiply in a way that Bohr's model couldn't explain. In 1916, Arnold Sommerfeld added elliptical orbits to the Bohr model to explain the extra emission lines, but this made the model very difficult to use, and it still couldn't explain more complex atoms.

== Discovery of the proton ==
Back in 1815, William Prout observed that the atomic weights of the known elements were multiples of hydrogen's atomic weight, so he hypothesized that all atoms are agglomerations of hydrogen, a particle which he dubbed "the protyle". Prout's hypothesis was put into doubt when some elements were found to deviate from this pattern—e.g. chlorine atoms on average weigh 35.45 daltons—but when isotopes were discovered in 1913, Prout's observation gained renewed attention.

In 1917 Rutherford bombarded nitrogen gas with alpha particles and observed hydrogen ions being emitted from the gas. Rutherford concluded that the alpha particles struck the nuclei of the nitrogen atoms, causing hydrogen ions to split off.

These observations led Rutherford to conclude that the hydrogen nucleus was a singular particle with a positive charge equal to that of the electron's negative charge. The name "proton" was suggested by Rutherford at an informal meeting of fellow physicists in Cardiff in 1920.

The charge number of an atomic nucleus was found to be equal to the element's ordinal position on the periodic table. The nuclear charge number thus provided a simple and clear-cut way of distinguishing the chemical elements from each other, as opposed to Lavoisier's classic definition of a chemical element being a substance that cannot be broken down into simpler substances by chemical reactions. The charge number or proton number was thereafter referred to as the atomic number of the element. In 1923, the International Committee on Chemical Elements officially declared the atomic number to be the distinguishing quality of a chemical element.

Beginning around 1913, the concept that alpha particles emerged from the atomic nucleus lead to the idea that these particle were present in the nucleus. When Van den Broek noted that the alpha particle scattering data across different elements followed atomic number and not atomic weight, he concluded that the nucleus must also have electrons. This "nuclear electron hypothesis" would be the basis of the earliest nuclear physics models. It could account for stability of alpha particles and for the then newly discovered isomers. It fueled numerous models of the nucleus as a combination of protons and electrons before finally being disproven when the neutron was discovered.

== Quantum mechanical models ==
The five filled atomic orbitals of a neon atom separated and arranged in order of increasing energy from left to right, with the last three orbitals being equal in energy. Each orbital holds up to two electrons, which most probably exist in the zones represented by the colored bubbles. Each electron is equally present in both orbital zones, shown here by color only to highlight the different wave phase.

In 1924, Louis de Broglie proposed that all particles—particularly subatomic particles such as electrons—have an associated wave. Erwin Schrödinger, fascinated by this idea, developed an equation that describes an electron as a wave function instead of a point. This approach predicted many of the spectral phenomena that Bohr's model failed to explain, but it was difficult to visualize, and faced opposition. One of its critics, Max Born, proposed instead that Schrödinger's wave function did not describe the physical extent of an electron (like a charge distribution in classical electromagnetism), but rather gave the probability that an electron would, when measured, be found at a particular point. This reconciled the ideas of wave-like and particle-like electrons: the behavior of an electron, or of any other subatomic entity, has both wave-like and particle-like aspects, and whether one aspect or the other is observed depend upon the experiment.

Schrödinger's wave model for hydrogen replaced Bohr's circular orbits with atomic orbitals giving only the probability of finding an electron at positions around the nucleus. The orbitals come in a variety of shapes depending on their energy level and angular momentum. The shapes of atomic orbitals are found by solving the Schrödinger equation. Analytic solutions of the Schrödinger equation are known for the hydrogen atom and hydrogen-like atoms such as the hydrogen molecular ion. Beginning with the helium atom—which contains just two electrons—numerical methods are used to solve the Schrödinger equation.

Qualitatively the shape of the atomic orbitals of multi-electron atoms resemble the states of the hydrogen atom. The Pauli principle requires the distribution of these electrons within the atomic orbitals such that no more than two electrons are assigned to any one orbital; this requirement profoundly affects the atomic properties and ultimately the bonding of atoms into molecules.

== Discovery of the neutron ==
Physicists in the 1920s believed that the atomic nucleus contained protons plus a number of "nuclear electrons" that reduced the overall charge. These "nuclear electrons" were distinct from the electrons that orbited the nucleus. This incorrect hypothesis would have explained why the atomic numbers of the elements were less than their atomic weights, and why radioactive elements emit electrons (beta radiation) in the process of nuclear decay. Rutherford even hypothesized that a proton and an electron could bind tightly together into a "neutral doublet". Rutherford wrote that the existence of such "neutral doublets" moving freely through space would provide a more plausible explanation for how the heavier elements could have formed in the genesis of the Universe, given that it is hard for a lone proton to fuse with a large atomic nucleus because of the repulsive electric field.

In 1928, Walter Bothe observed that beryllium emitted a highly penetrating, electrically neutral radiation when bombarded with alpha particles. It was later discovered that this radiation could knock hydrogen atoms out of paraffin wax. Initially it was thought to be high-energy gamma radiation, since gamma radiation had a similar effect on electrons in metals, but James Chadwick found that the ionization effect was too strong for it to be due to electromagnetic radiation, so long as energy and momentum were conserved in the interaction. In 1932, Chadwick exposed various elements, such as hydrogen and nitrogen, to the mysterious "beryllium radiation", and by measuring the energies of the recoiling charged particles, he deduced that the radiation was actually composed of electrically neutral particles which could not be massless like the gamma ray, but instead were required to have a mass similar to that of a proton. Chadwick called this new particle "the neutron" and believed that it to be a proton and electron fused together because the neutron had about the same mass as a proton and an electron's mass is negligible by comparison. Before the end of 1932, this model was challenged by Dmitri Ivanenko who proposed that the neutron was an elementary particle. This model would eventually lead to the modern theory of the nucleus.

== See also ==
- Spectroscopy
- Alchemy
- Atom
- History of molecular theory
- Discovery of chemical elements
- Introduction to quantum mechanics
- Kinetic theory of gases
