= Prout (unit) =

Obsolete unit of energy

The prout is an obsolete unit of energy, whose value is:

$1 \ \text{prout} = 2.9638 \times 10^{-14} \ \text{J}$

This is equal to one twelfth of the binding energy of the deuteron.

== History ==
The "prout" is a unit of nuclear binding energy, and is 1/12 the binding energy of the deuteron, or 185.5 keV.

This unit is named after William Prout, who first proposed a quantum of mass.

"Proutons" was an early candidate for the name of what are now called protons.

This unit was used in the mid-19th century by several physicists, including Marignac, who first proposed it in 1844.

== See also ==
- William Prout
  - Prout's hypothesis
- Atomic number
