= Whole number rule =

Rule of thumb in chemistry

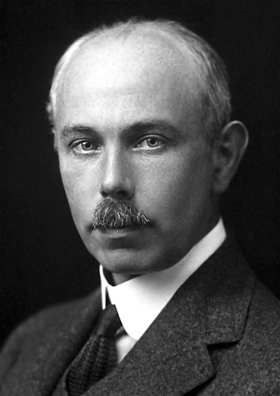
Francis W. Aston received the 1922 Nobel Prize in Chemistry for his enunciation of the whole-number rule.

In chemistry, the whole number rule states that the masses of the isotopes are whole number multiples of the mass of the hydrogen atom. The rule is a modified version of Prout's hypothesis proposed in 1815, to the effect that atomic weights are multiples of the weight of the hydrogen atom. It is also known as the Aston whole number rule after Francis W. Aston who was awarded the Nobel Prize in Chemistry in 1922 "for his discovery, by means of his mass spectrograph, of isotopes, in a large number of non-radioactive elements, and for his enunciation of the whole-number rule".

== Law of definite proportions ==
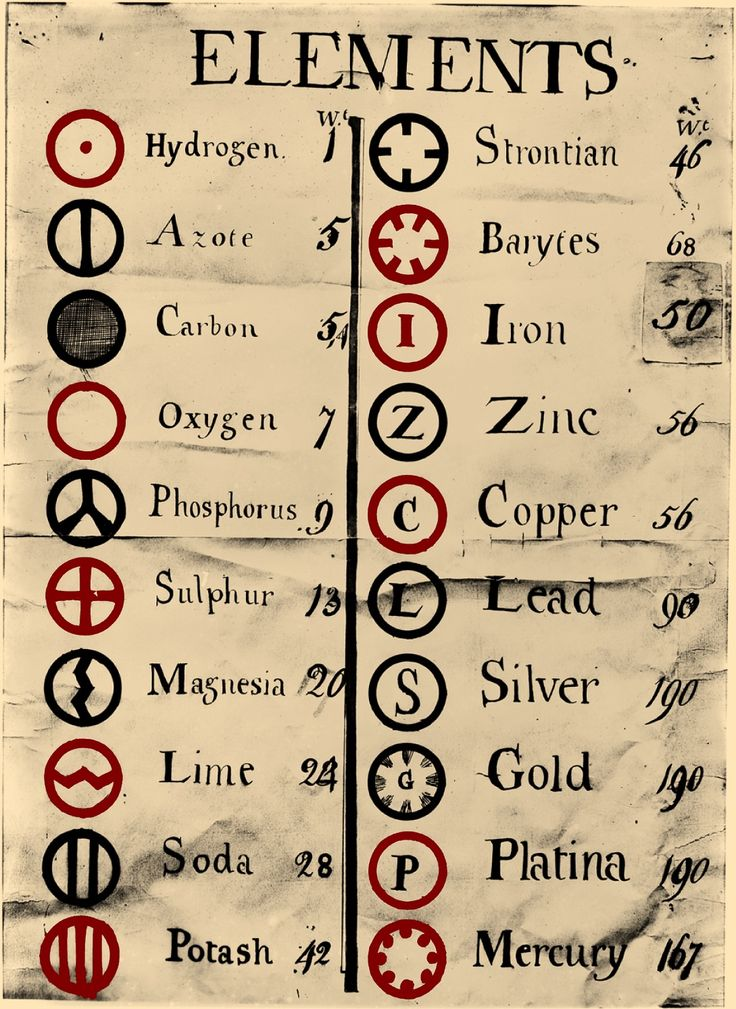
John Dalton's list of atomic weights and symbols

The law of definite proportions was formulated by Joseph Proust around 1800 and states that all samples of a chemical compound will have the same elemental composition by mass. The atomic theory of John Dalton expanded this concept and explained matter as consisting of discrete atoms with one kind of atom for each element combined in fixed proportions to form compounds.

== Prout's hypothesis ==
In 1815, William Prout reported on his observation that the atomic masses of the elements were whole multiples of the atomic mass of hydrogen. He then hypothesized that the hydrogen atom was the fundamental object and that the other elements were a combination of different numbers of hydrogen atoms.

== Aston's discovery of isotopes ==
In 1920, Francis W. Aston demonstrated through the use of a mass spectrometer that apparent deviations from Prout's hypothesis are predominantly due to the existence of isotopes. For example, Aston discovered that neon has two isotopes with masses very close to 20 and 22 as per the whole number rule, and proposed that the non-integer value 20.2 for the atomic weight of neon is due to the fact that natural neon is a mixture of about 90% neon-20 and 10% neon-22). A secondary cause of deviations is the binding energy or mass defect of the individual isotopes.

== Discovery of the neutron ==
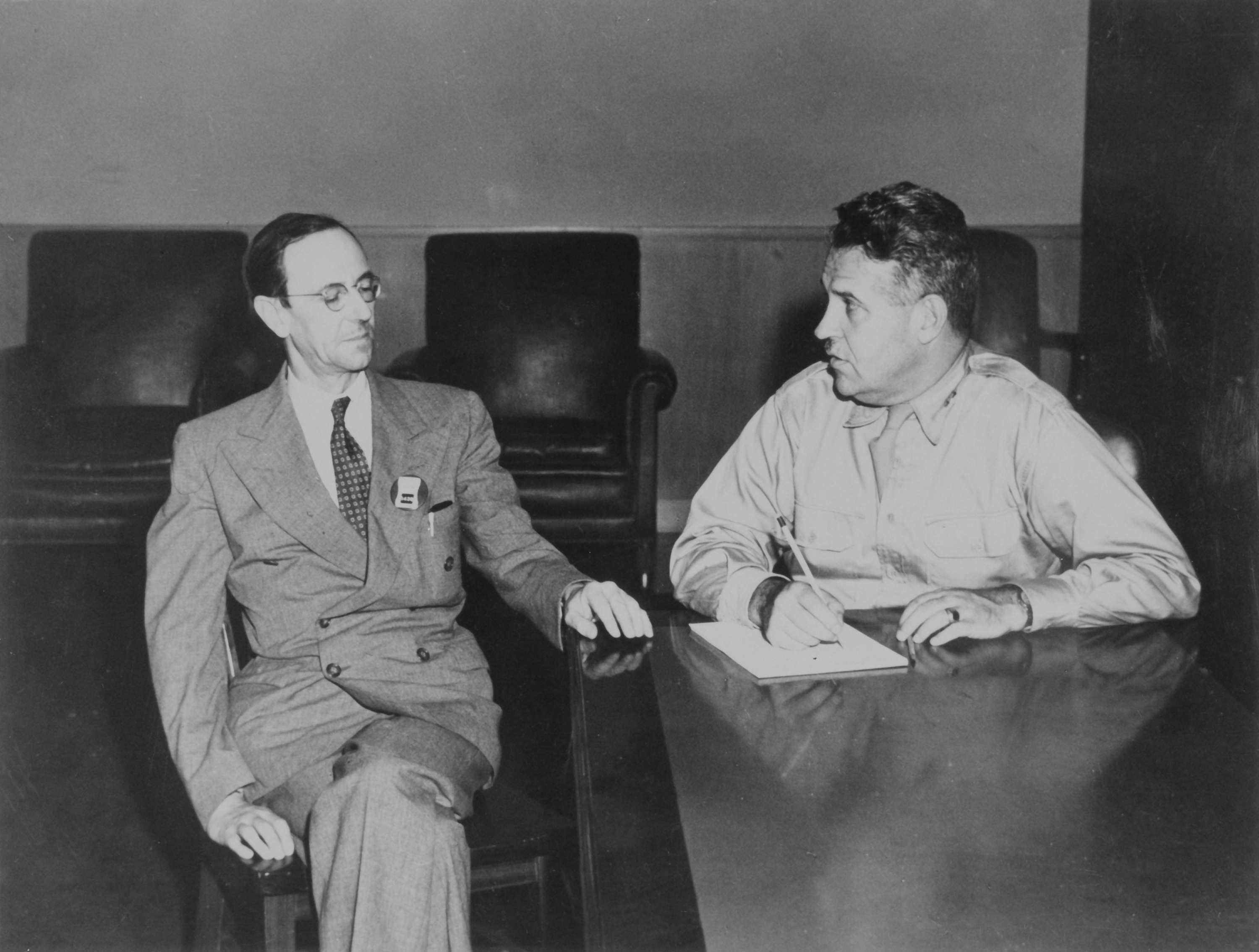
James Chadwick, discoverer of the neutron, with General Leslie Groves, director of the Manhattan Project.

During the 1920s, it was thought that the atomic nucleus was made of protons and electrons, which would account for the disparity between the atomic number of an atom and its atomic mass. In 1932, James Chadwick discovered an uncharged particle of approximately the mass as the proton, which he called the neutron. The fact that the atomic nucleus is composed of protons and neutrons was rapidly accepted and Chadwick was awarded the Nobel Prize in Physics in 1935 for his discovery.

The modern form of the whole number rule is that the atomic mass of a given elemental isotope is approximately the mass number (number of protons plus neutrons) times a dalton (approximate mass of a proton, neutron, or hydrogen-1 atom). This rule predicts the atomic mass of nuclides and isotopes with an error of at most 1%, with most of the error explained by the mass deficit caused by nuclear binding energy.
