= J. J. Thomson =

British physicist (1856–1940)

Sir J. J. Thomson OM FRS
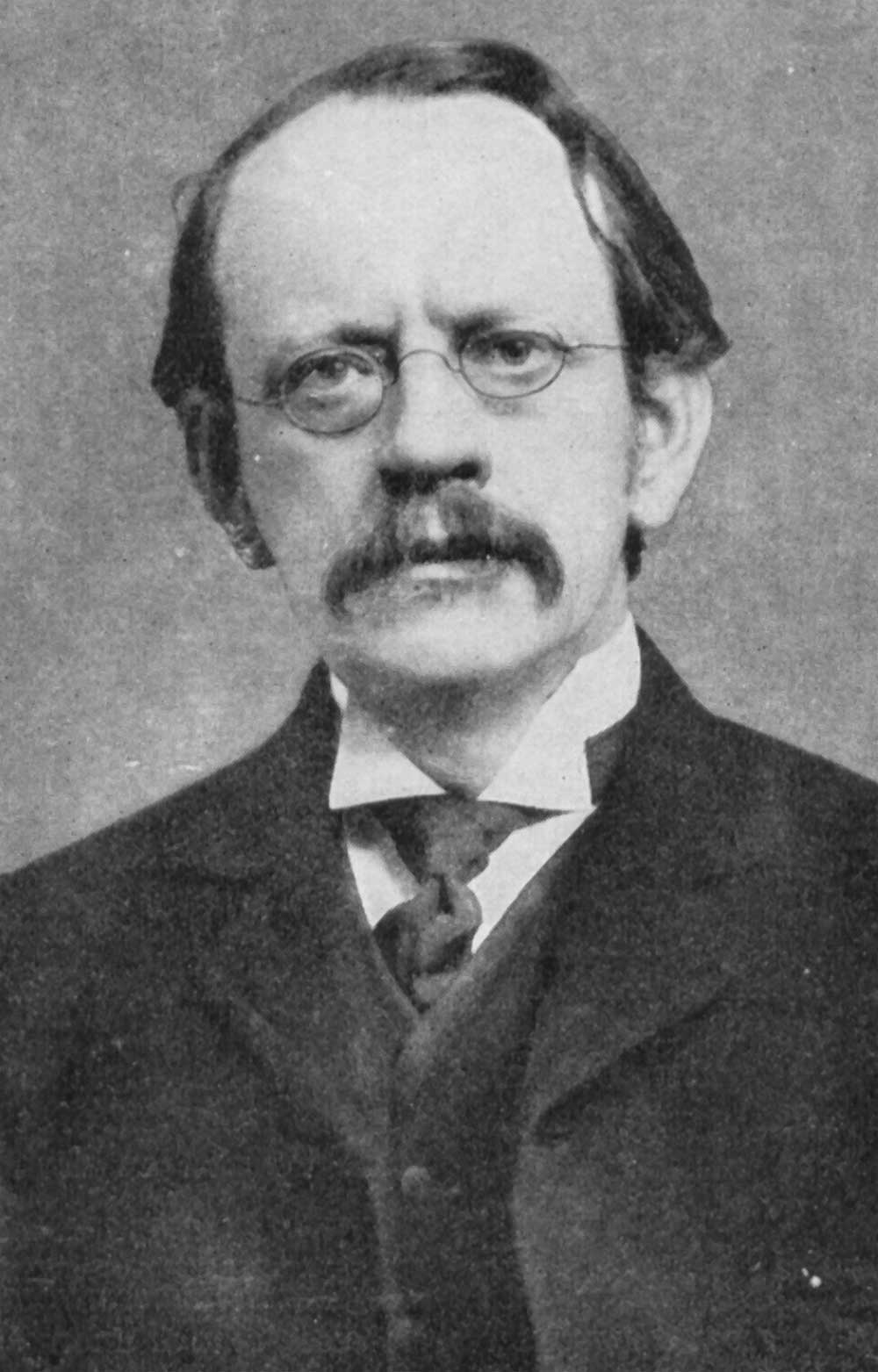
- Thomson in 1915

30th Master of Trinity College, Cambridge
- In office 1918–1940
- Preceded by: Henry Montagu Butler
- Succeeded by: George Macaulay Trevelyan

42nd President of the Royal Society
- In office 1915–1920
- Preceded by: Sir William Crookes
- Succeeded by: Sir Charles Sherrington

Personal details
- Born: Joseph John Thomson; 18 December 1856 Manchester, England
- Died: 30 August 1940 (aged 83) Cambridge, England
- Resting place: Westminster Abbey
- Spouse: Rose Elisabeth Paget (m. 1890)
- Children: 2, including George
- Relatives: George Edward Paget (father-in-law)
- Education: Owens College; University of Cambridge (BA, MA)
- Known for: Discovery of the electron; Plum pudding model; Mass spectrometry; Electromagnetic mass
- Awards: Royal Medal (1894); Hodgkins Medal (1902); Hughes Medal (1902); Nobel Prize in Physics (1906); Elliott Cresson Medal (1910); Copley Medal (1914); Albert Medal (1915); Franklin Medal (1922); Faraday Medal (1925); Kelvin Gold Medal (1938)
- Scientific career
- Fields: Physics
- Workplaces: University of Cambridge
- Academic advisors: Lord Rayleigh; Balfour Stewart
- Notable students: See list: Edward Appleton; Francis Aston; Charles Barkla; D. M. Bose; Lawrence Bragg; William Henry Bragg; Hugh Callendar; Thomas Laby; Elizabeth Laird; Paul Langevin; Owen Richardson; Ernest Rutherford; Robert Strutt; G. I. Taylor; G. P. Thomson; J. S. E. Townsend; Balthasar van der Pol; H. E. Watson; C. T. R. Wilson; Harold Albert Wilson

Sir Joseph John Thomson (18 December 1856 – 30 August 1940) was a British physicist. He received the 1906 Nobel Prize in Physics "in recognition of the great merits of his theoretical and experimental investigations on the conduction of electricity by gases." In 1897, he showed that cathode rays were composed of previously unknown negatively charged particles (now called electrons), which he calculated must have bodies much smaller than atoms and a very large charge-to-mass ratio. The electron was the first subatomic particle to be discovered.

Thomson is credited with finding the first evidence for isotopes of a stable (non-radioactive) element in 1912, as part of his exploration into the composition of canal rays (positive ions). His experiments to determine the nature of positively charged particles, with Francis William Aston, were the first use of mass spectrometry and led to the development of the mass spectrograph.

Thomson was an influential teacher, and seven of his students went on to win Nobel Prizes: Ernest Rutherford (Chemistry 1908), Lawrence Bragg (Physics 1915), Charles Barkla (Physics 1917), Francis William Aston (Chemistry 1922), Charles Thomson Rees Wilson (Physics 1927), Owen Richardson (Physics 1928) and Edward Victor Appleton (Physics 1947). His son, George Paget Thomson, shared the 1937 Nobel Prize in Physics with Clinton Davisson "for their experimental discovery of the diffraction of electrons by crystals".

== Biography ==
Joseph John Thomson was born on 18 December 1856 in Cheetham Hill, Manchester, England. His mother, Emma Thomson (née Swindells), came from a local textile family. His father, Joseph James Thomson, ran an antiquarian bookshop founded by Thomson's great-grandfather. Joseph John had a brother, Frederick Vernon Thomson, who was two years younger than he was. Thomson was a reserved yet devout Anglican.

=== Education ===
Thomson's early education was in small private schools where he demonstrated outstanding talent and interest in science. In 1870, he was admitted to Owens College in Manchester (now the University of Manchester) at the unusually young age of 14, and came under the influence of Balfour Stewart, Professor of Physics, who initiated him into physical research. He began experimenting with contact electrification and soon published his first scientific paper. His parents planned to enroll him as an apprentice engineer to Sharp, Stewart & Co, a locomotive manufacturer, but these plans were cut short when his father died in 1873.

In 1876, Thomson moved on to Trinity College, Cambridge. In 1880, he received a Bachelor of Arts in Mathematics (Second Wrangler in the Tripos and 2nd Smith's Prizeman). He applied for and became a Fellow of Trinity College the following year. He obtained a Master of Arts (Adams Prizeman) in 1883.

=== Career ===
On 22 December 1884, Thomson was appointed Cavendish Professor of Physics at the University of Cambridge. This appointment caused considerable surprise; candidates such as Osborne Reynolds and Richard Glazebrook were older and more experienced in laboratory work, whereas Thomson was known for his work as a mathematician—being recognised as an exceptional talent.

Thomson was knighted in 1908 and appointed to the Order of Merit in 1912. At Oxford, he gave the 1914 Romanes Lecture titled The Atomic Theory. In 1918, he became Master of Trinity College, Cambridge, a position he held until his death on 30 August 1940. His ashes rest in Westminster Abbey, near the graves of Isaac Newton and his former student, Ernest Rutherford.

Rutherford succeeded him as Cavendish Professor. Six of Thomson's research assistants and junior colleagues (Charles Glover Barkla, Niels Bohr, Max Born, William Henry Bragg, Owen Willans Richardson and Charles Thomson Rees Wilson) won the Nobel Prize in Physics, and two (Francis William Aston and Ernest Rutherford) won the Nobel Prize in Chemistry. Thomson's son, George Paget Thomson, won the 1937 Nobel Prize in Physics for proving the wave-like properties of electrons.

== Research ==
=== Early work ===
Thomson's prize-winning master's work, Treatise on the motion of vortex rings, shows his early interest in atomic structure. In it, Thomson mathematically described the motions of Lord Kelvin's vortex theory of the atom.

Thomson published a number of papers addressing both mathematical and experimental issues of electromagnetism. He examined the electromagnetic theory of light of James Clerk Maxwell, introduced the concept of electromagnetic mass of a charged particle, and demonstrated that a moving charged body would apparently increase in mass.

Much of his work in mathematical modelling of chemical processes can be thought of as early computational chemistry. In further work, published in book form as Applications of dynamics to physics and chemistry (1888), Thomson addressed the transformation of energy in mathematical and theoretical terms, suggesting that all energy might be kinetic. His next book, Notes on recent researches in electricity and magnetism (1893), built upon Maxwell's Treatise upon electricity and magnetism, and was sometimes referred to as "the third volume of Maxwell." In it, Thomson emphasized physical methods and experimentation and included extensive figures and diagrams of apparatus, including a number for the passage of electricity through gases. His third book, Elements of the mathematical theory of electricity and magnetism (1895) was a readable introduction to a wide variety of subjects, and achieved considerable popularity as a textbook.

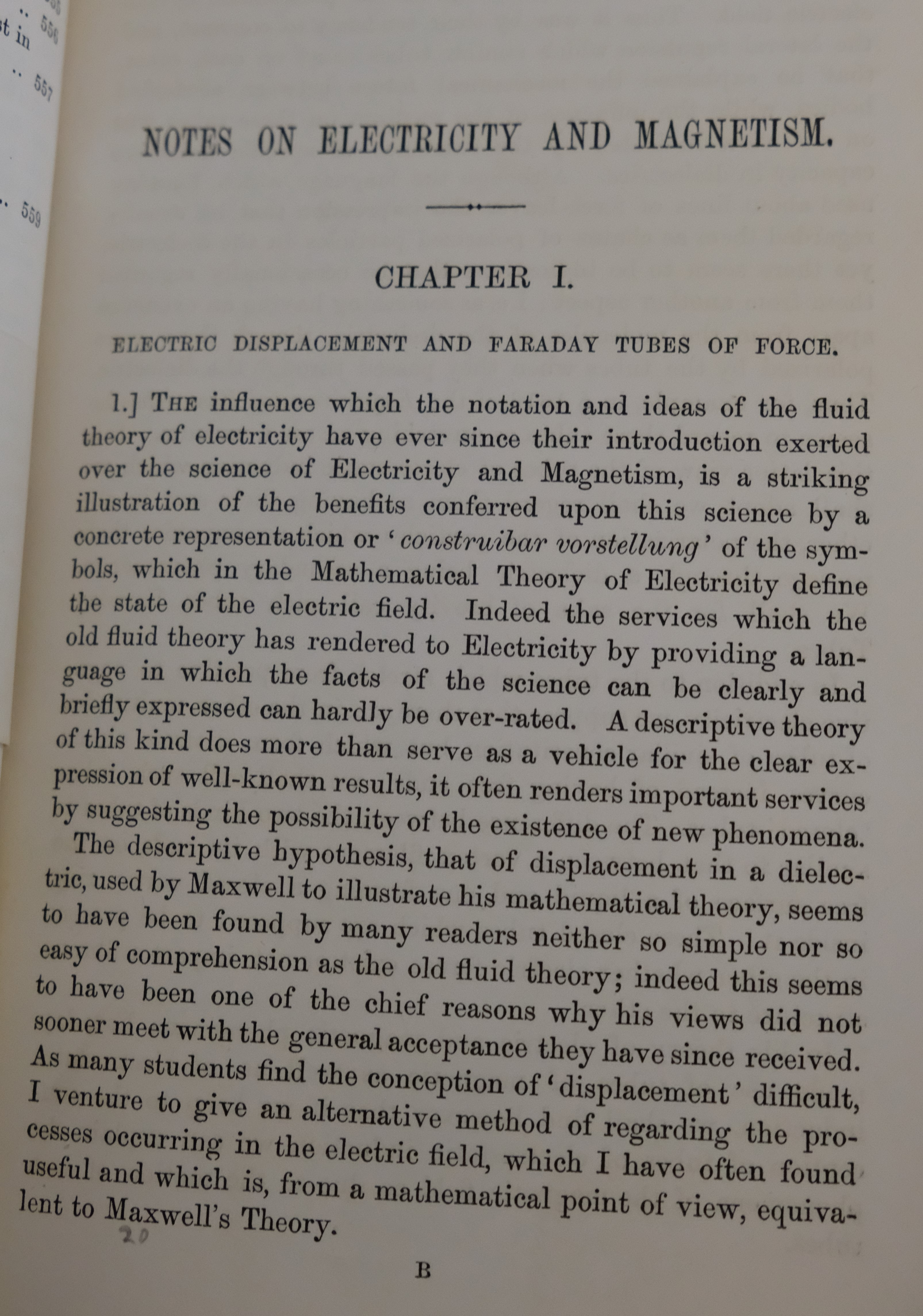
First page to Notes on Recent Researches in Electricity and Magnetism (1893)

A series of four lectures, given by Thomson on a visit to Princeton University in 1896, were subsequently published as Discharge of electricity through gases (1897). He also presented a series of six lectures at Yale University in 1904.

=== Discovery of the electron ===
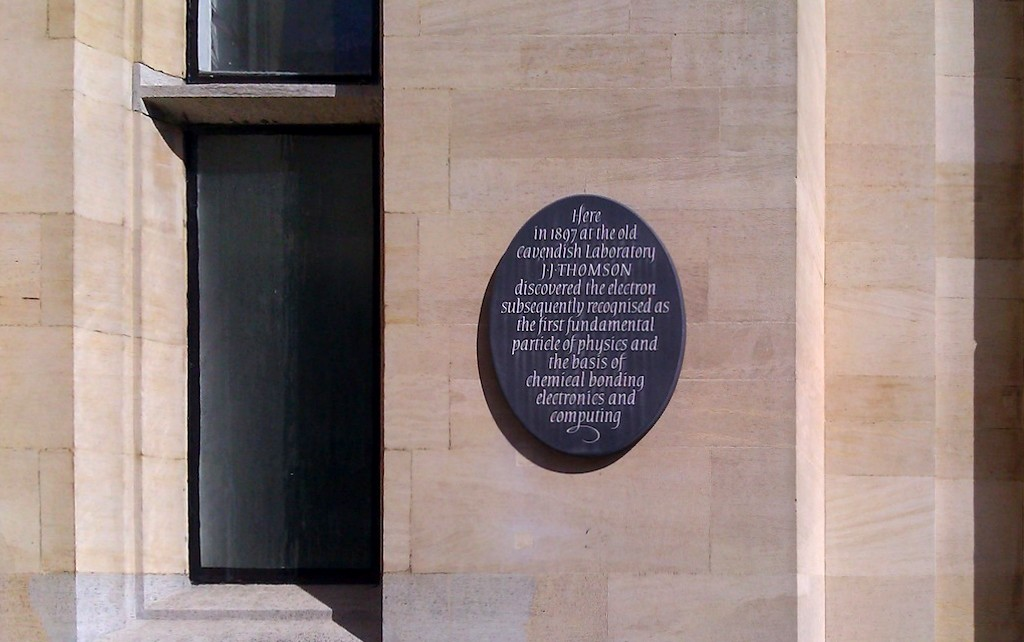
Plaque commemorating Thomson's discovery of the electron outside the old Cavendish Laboratory.

Several scientists, such as William Prout and Norman Lockyer, had suggested that atoms were built up from a more fundamental unit, but they envisioned this unit to be the size of the smallest atom, hydrogen. Thomson in 1897 was the first to suggest that one of the fundamental units of the atom was more than 1,000 times smaller than an atom, suggesting the subatomic particle now known as the electron. Thomson discovered this through his explorations on the properties of cathode rays. Thomson made his suggestion on 30 April 1897 following his discovery that cathode rays (at the time known as Lenard rays) could travel much further through air than expected for an atom-sized particle. He estimated the mass of cathode rays by measuring the heat generated when the rays hit a thermal junction and comparing this with the magnetic deflection of the rays. His experiments suggested not only that cathode rays were over 1,000 times lighter than the hydrogen atom, but also that their mass was the same in whichever type of atom they came from. He concluded that the rays were composed of very light, negatively charged particles which were a universal building block of atoms. He called the particles "corpuscles", but later scientists preferred the name electron, which had been suggested by George Johnstone Stoney in 1891, prior to Thomson's discovery.

In April 1897, Thomson had only early indications that the cathode rays could be deflected electrically (previous investigators such as Heinrich Hertz had thought they could not be). A month after Thomson's announcement of the corpuscle, he found that he could reliably deflect the rays by an electric field if he evacuated the discharge tube to a very low pressure. By comparing the deflection of a beam of cathode rays by electric and magnetic fields he obtained more robust measurements of the mass-to-charge ratio that confirmed his previous estimates. This became the classic means of measuring the charge-to-mass ratio of the electron. Later in 1899 he measured the charge of the electron to be of 6.8×10^{−10} esu.

Thomson believed that the corpuscles emerged from the atoms of the trace gas inside his cathode-ray tubes. He thus concluded that atoms were divisible, and that the corpuscles were their building blocks. In 1904, Thomson suggested a model of the atom, hypothesizing that it was a sphere of positive matter within which electrostatic forces determined the positioning of the corpuscles. To explain the overall neutral charge of the atom, he proposed that the corpuscles were distributed in a uniform sea of positive charge. In this "plum pudding model", the electrons were seen as embedded in the positive charge like raisins in a plum pudding (although in Thomson's model they were not stationary, but orbiting rapidly).

Thomson made the discovery around the same time that Walter Kaufmann and Emil Wiechert discovered the correct mass to charge ratio of these cathode rays (electrons).

The name electron was adopted for these particles by the scientific community, mainly due to the advocation by George Francis FitzGerald, Joseph Larmor, and Hendrik Lorentz. The term was originally coined by George Johnstone Stoney in 1891 as a tentative name for the basic unit of electrical charge (which had then yet to be discovered). For some years Thomson resisted using the word "electron" because he didn't like how some physicists talked of a "positive electron" that was supposed to be the elementary unit of positive charge just as the "negative electron" is the elementary unit of negative charge. Thomson preferred to stick with the word "corpuscle" which he strictly defined as negatively charged. He relented by 1914, using the word "electron" in his book The Atomic Theory. In 1920, Rutherford and his fellows agreed to call the nucleus of the hydrogen ion "proton", establishing a distinct name for the smallest known positively-charged particle of matter (that can exist independently anyway).

=== Isotopes and mass spectrometry ===
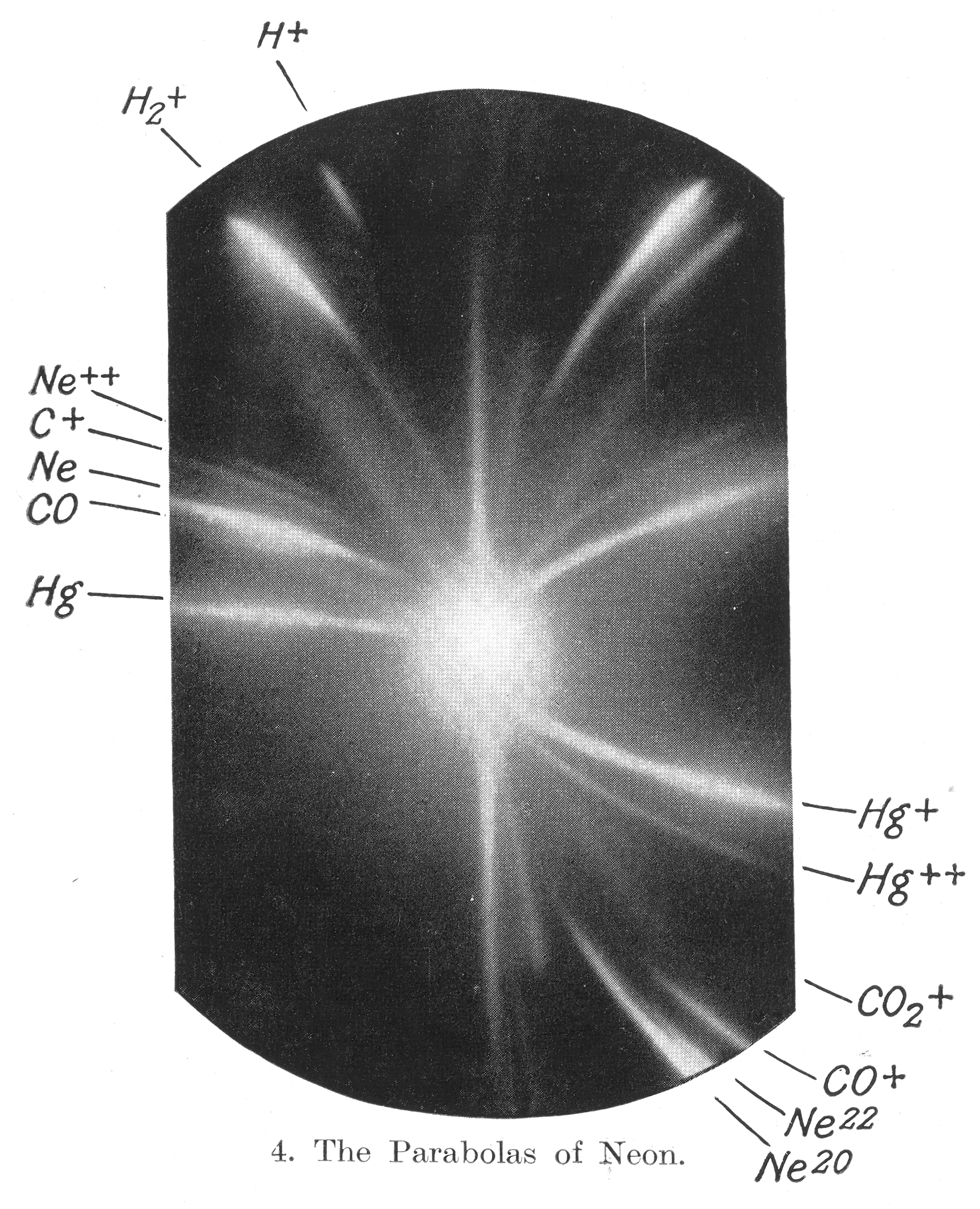
In the bottom right corner of this photographic plate are markings for the two isotopes of neon: neon-20 and neon-22.

In 1912, as part of his exploration into the composition of the streams of positively charged particles then known as canal rays, Thomson and his research assistant, F. W. Aston, channelled a stream of neon ions through a magnetic and an electric field and measured its deflection by placing a photographic plate in its path. They observed two patches of light on the photographic plate (see image on right), which suggested two different parabolas of deflection, and concluded that neon is composed of atoms of two different atomic masses (neon-20 and neon-22), that is to say of two isotopes. This was the first evidence for isotopes of a stable element; Frederick Soddy had previously proposed the existence of isotopes to explain the decay of certain radioactive elements.

Thomson's separation of neon isotopes by their mass was the first example of mass spectrometry, which was subsequently improved and developed into a general method by F. W. Aston and by A. J. Dempster.

External videos
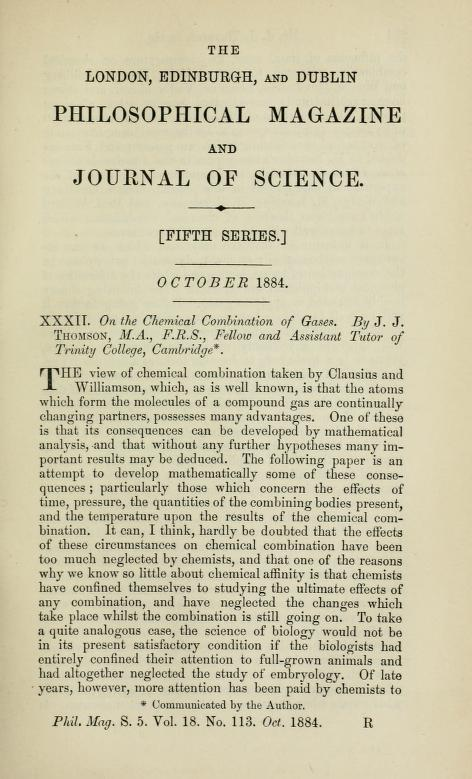
- The Early Life of J. J. Thomson: Computational Chemistry and Gas Discharge Experiments

=== Experiments with cathode rays ===
Earlier, physicists debated whether cathode rays were immaterial like light ("some process in the aether") or were "in fact wholly material, and ... mark the paths of particles of matter charged with negative electricity", quoting Thomson. The aetherial hypothesis was vague, but the particle hypothesis was definite enough for Thomson to test.

==== Magnetic deflection ====
Thomson first investigated the magnetic deflection of cathode rays. Cathode rays were produced in the side tube on the left of the apparatus and passed through the anode into the main bell jar, where they were deflected by a magnet. Thomson detected their path by the fluorescence on a squared screen in the jar. He found that whatever the material of the anode and the gas in the jar, the deflection of the rays was the same, suggesting that the rays were of the same form whatever their origin.

==== Electrical charge ====
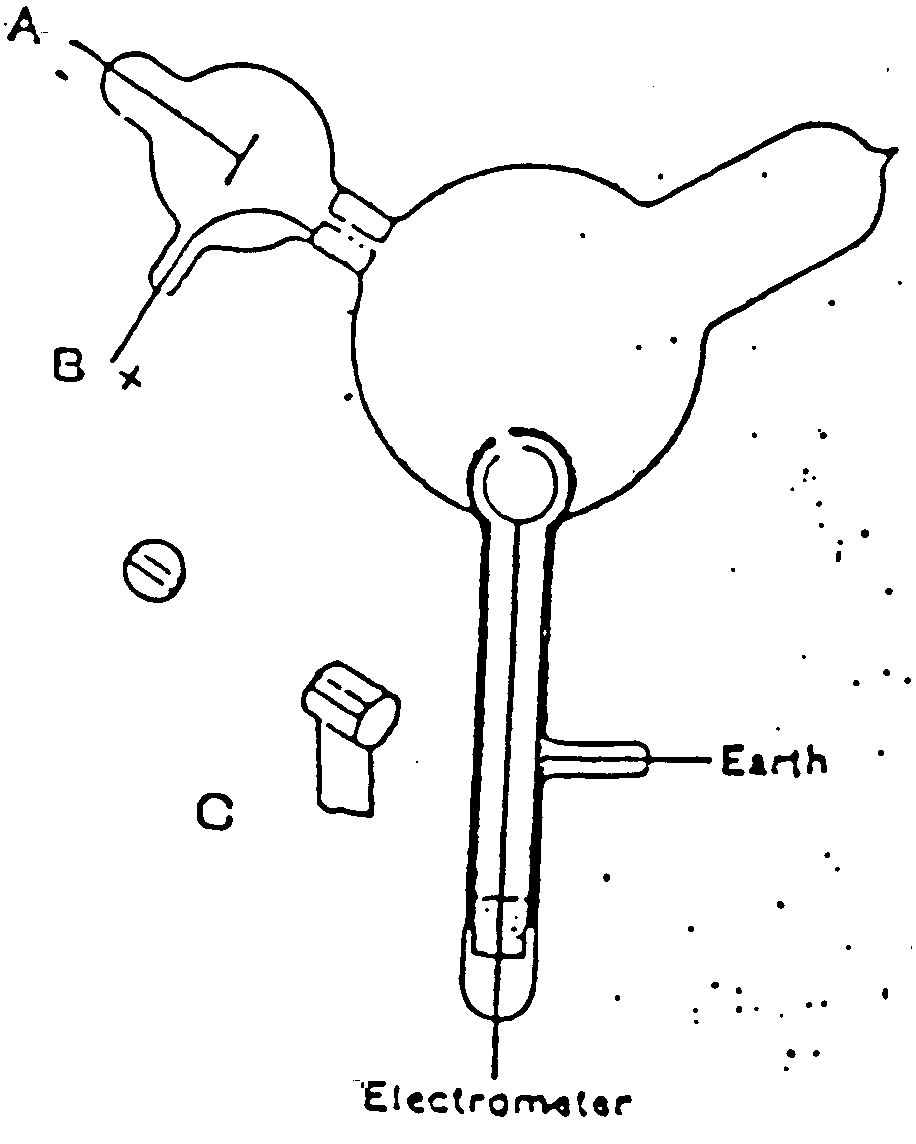
The cathode-ray tube by which J. J. Thomson demonstrated that cathode rays could be deflected by a magnetic field, and that their negative charge was not a separate phenomenon.

While supporters of the aetherial theory accepted the possibility that negatively charged particles are produced in Crookes tubes, they believed that they are a mere by-product and that the cathode rays themselves are immaterial. Thomson set out to investigate whether or not he could actually separate the charge from the rays.

Thomson constructed a Crookes tube with an electrometer set to one side, out of the direct path of the cathode rays. Thomson could trace the path of the ray by observing the phosphorescent patch it created where it hit the surface of the tube. Thomson observed that the electrometer registered a charge only when he deflected the cathode ray to it with a magnet. He concluded that the negative charge and the rays were one and the same.

==== Electrical deflection ====
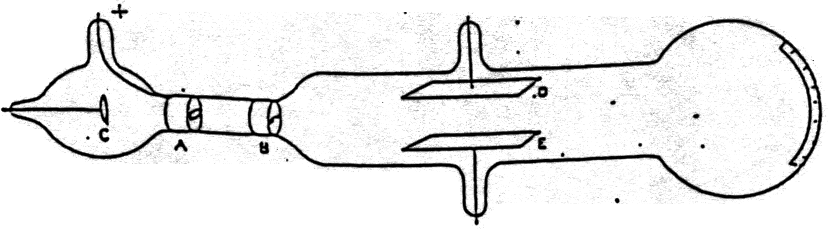
Thomson's illustration of the Crookes tube by which he observed the deflection of cathode rays by an electric field (and later measured their mass-to-charge ratio). Cathode rays were emitted from the cathode C, passed through slits A (the anode) and B (grounded), then through the electric field generated between plates D and E, finally impacting the surface at the far end.

The cathode ray (blue line) was deflected by the electric field (yellow).

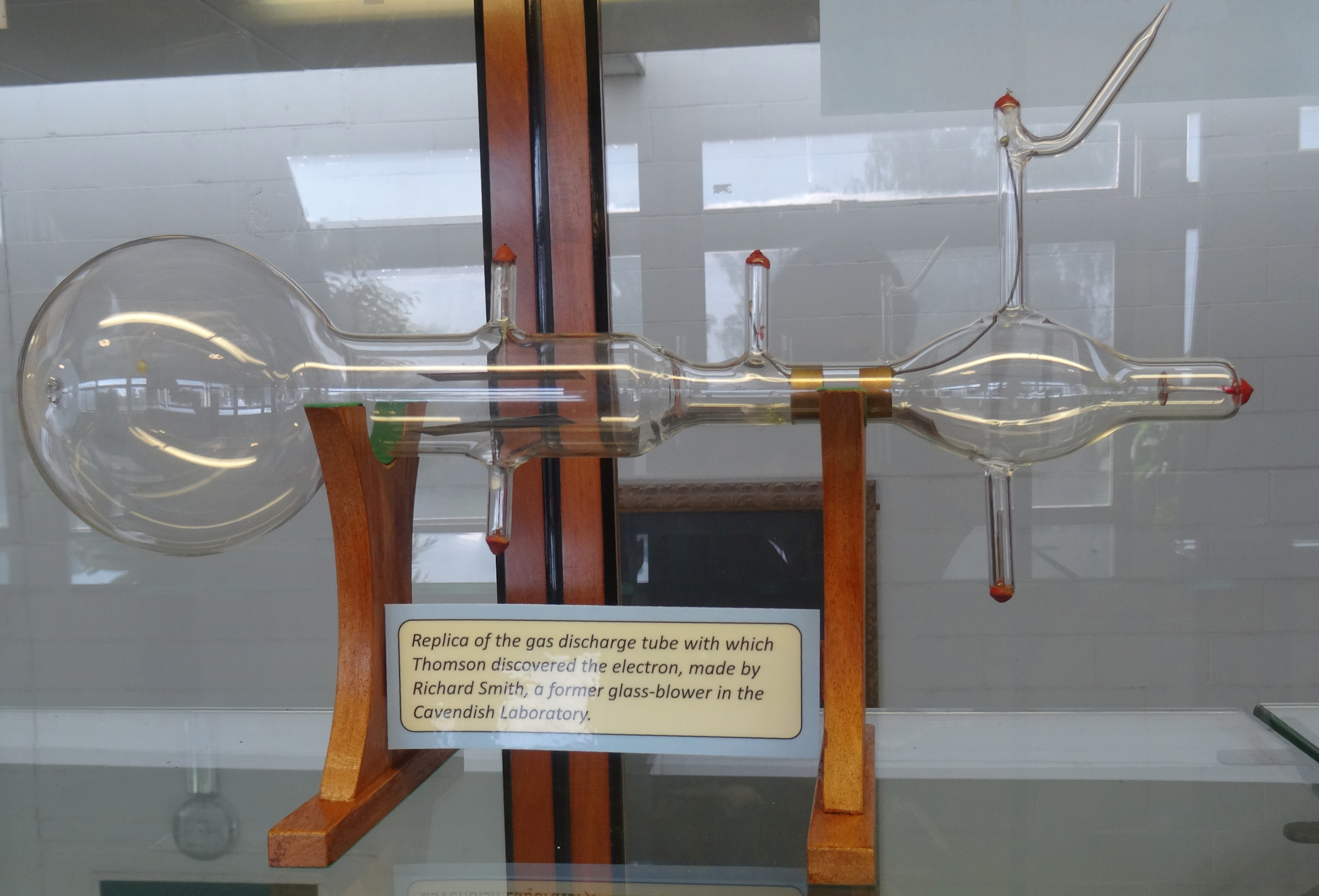
Cathode-ray tube with electrical deflection.

In May–June 1897, Thomson investigated whether or not the rays could be deflected by an electric field. Previous experimenters had failed to observe this, but Thomson believed their experiments were flawed because their tubes contained too much gas.

Thomson constructed a Crookes tube with a better vacuum. At the start of the tube was the cathode from which the rays projected. The rays were sharpened to a beam by two metal slits – the first of these slits doubled as the anode, the second was connected to the earth. The beam then passed between two parallel aluminium plates, which produced an electric field between them when they were connected to a battery. The end of the tube was a large sphere where the beam would impact on the glass, creating a glowing patch. Thomson pasted a scale to the surface of this sphere to measure the deflection of the beam. Any electron beam would collide with some residual gas atoms within the Crookes tube, thereby ionizing them and producing electrons and ions in the tube (space charge); in previous experiments this space charge electrically screened the externally applied electric field. However, in Thomson's Crookes tube the density of residual atoms was so low that the space charge from the electrons and ions was insufficient to electrically screen the externally applied electric field, which permitted Thomson to successfully observe electrical deflection.

When the upper plate was connected to the negative pole of the battery and the lower plate to the positive pole, the glowing patch moved downwards, and when the polarity was reversed, the patch moved upwards.

==== Measurement of mass-to-charge ratio ====
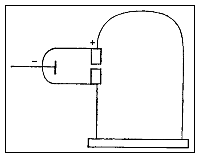

In his classic experiment, Thomson measured the mass-to-charge ratio of the cathode rays by measuring how much they were deflected by a magnetic field and comparing this with the electric deflection. He used the same apparatus as in his previous experiment, but placed the discharge tube between the poles of a large electromagnet. He found that the mass-to-charge ratio was over a thousand times lower than that of a hydrogen ion (H^{+}), suggesting either that the particles were very light and/or very highly charged. Significantly, the rays from every cathode yielded the same mass-to-charge ratio. This is in contrast to anode rays (now known to arise from positive ions emitted by the anode), where the mass-to-charge ratio varies from anode-to-anode. Thomson himself remained critical of what his work established, in his Nobel Prize acceptance speech referring to "corpuscles" rather than "electrons".

Thomson's calculations can be summarised as follows (in his original notation, using F instead of E for the electric field and H instead of B for the magnetic field):

The electric deflection is given by $\Theta = Fel / mv^2$, where Θ is the angular electric deflection, F is applied electric intensity, e is the charge of the cathode ray particles, l is the length of the electric plates, m is the mass of the cathode ray particles and v is the velocity of the cathode ray particles. The magnetic deflection is given by $\phi = Hel / mv$, where φ is the angular magnetic deflection and H is the applied magnetic field intensity.

The magnetic field was varied until the magnetic and electric deflections were the same, when $\Theta = \phi, Fel / mv^2 = Hel / mv$. This can be simplified to give $m/e = H^2 l/F\Theta$. The electric deflection was measured separately to give Θ and H, F and l were known, so m/e could be calculated.

==== Conclusions ====
As the cathode rays carry a charge of negative electricity, are deflected by an electrostatic force as if they were negatively electrified, and are acted on by a magnetic force in just the way in which this force would act on a negatively electrified body moving along the path of these rays, I can see no escape from the conclusion that they are charges of negative electricity carried by particles of matter.

— J. J. Thomson

As to the source of these particles, Thomson believed they emerged from the molecules of gas in the vicinity of the cathode.

If, in the very intense electric field in the neighbourhood of the cathode, the molecules of the gas are dissociated and are split up, not into the ordinary chemical atoms, but into these primordial atoms, which we shall for brevity call corpuscles; and if these corpuscles are charged with electricity and projected from the cathode by the electric field, they would behave exactly like the cathode rays.

— J. J. Thomson

Thomson imagined the atom as being made up of these corpuscles orbiting in a sea of positive charge; this was his plum pudding model. This model was later proved incorrect when his student Ernest Rutherford showed that the positive charge is concentrated in the nucleus of the atom.

=== Other work ===
In 1905, Thomson discovered the natural radioactivity of potassium.

In 1906, Thomson demonstrated that hydrogen had only a single electron per atom. Previous theories allowed various numbers of electrons.

From 1916 to 1918, Thomson chaired the "Committee appointed by the Prime Minister to enquire into the Position of Natural Science in the Educational System of Great Britain". The Report of the Committee, published in 1918, was known as the Thomson Report.

== Family ==
In 1890, Thomson married Rose Elisabeth Paget at the church of St Mary the Less. Rose, who was the daughter of Sir George Edward Paget, a physician and then Regius Professor of Physic at Cambridge, was interested in physics. Beginning in 1882, women could attend demonstrations and lectures at the University of Cambridge. Rose attended demonstrations and lectures, among them Thomson's, leading to their relationship.

They had two children: George Paget Thomson, who was also awarded a Nobel Prize for his work on the wave properties of the electron; and Joan Paget Thomson (later Charnock), who became an author—writing children's books, non-fiction, and biographies.

== Recognition ==
=== Memberships ===
Year	Organisation	Type	Ref.
1884	Royal Society	Fellow	
1902	American Academy of Arts and Sciences	International Honorary Member	
1903	American Philosophical Society	International Member	
1903	National Academy of Sciences	International Member	
1905	Royal Society of Edinburgh	Honorary Fellow	

=== Awards ===
Year	Organisation	Award	Citation	Ref.
1894	Royal Society	Royal Medal	"For his contributions to mathematical and experimental physics especially to electrical theory."	
1902	Smithsonian Institution	Hodgkins Medal	—	
1902	Royal Society	Hughes Medal	"For his numerous contributions to electric science, especially in reference to the phenomena of electric discharge in gases."	
1906	Royal Swedish Academy of Sciences	Nobel Prize in Physics	"In recognition of the great merits of his theoretical and experimental investigations on the conduction of electricity by gases."	
1910	Franklin Institute	Elliott Cresson Medal	"For distinguished work in physical sciences."	
1914	Royal Society	Copley Medal	"On the ground[s] of his discoveries in physical science."	
1915	Royal Society of Arts	Albert Medal	—	
1922	Franklin Institute	Franklin Medal	"For service as teacher and leader in electricity and the constitution of matter."	
1925	Institution of Electrical Engineers	Faraday Medal	—	
1938	Institution of Civil Engineers	Kelvin Gold Medal	—	

== Commemoration ==
In November 1927, Thomson opened the Thomson building, named in his honour, in the Leys School, Cambridge.

In 1991, the thomson (symbol: Th) was proposed as a unit to measure mass-to-charge ratio in mass spectrometry in his honour.

J J Thomson Avenue, on the University of Cambridge's West Cambridge site, is named after Thomson.

The Thomson Medal Award, sponsored by the International Mass Spectrometry Foundation, is named after Thomson.

The Institute of Physics Joseph Thomson Medal and Prize is named after Thomson.

Thomson Crescent in Deep River, Ontario, connects with Rutherford Ave.

== See also ==
- History of physics
- List of presidents of the Royal Society

== Bibliography ==
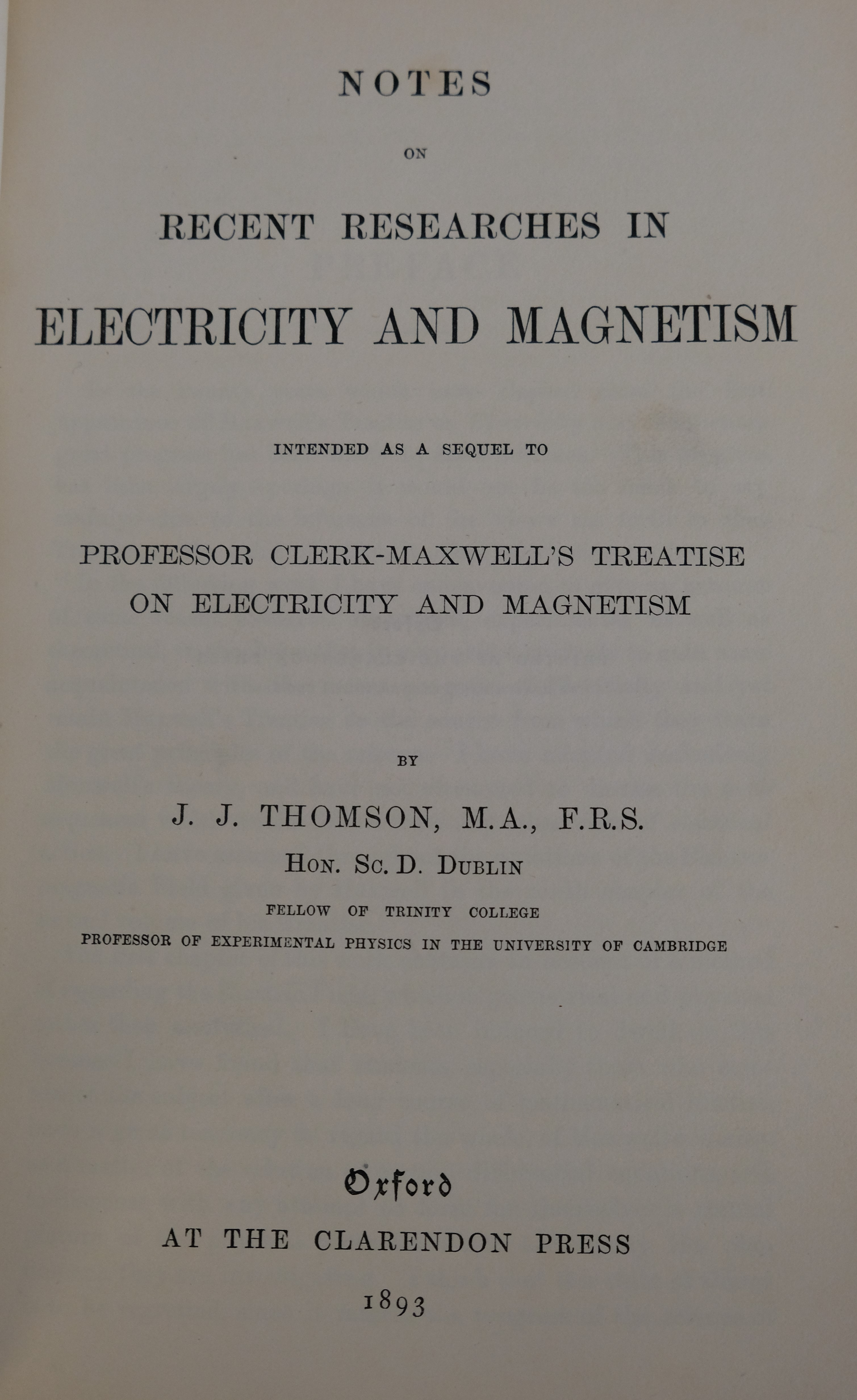
Title page to Notes on Recent Researches in Electricity and Magnetism (1893)

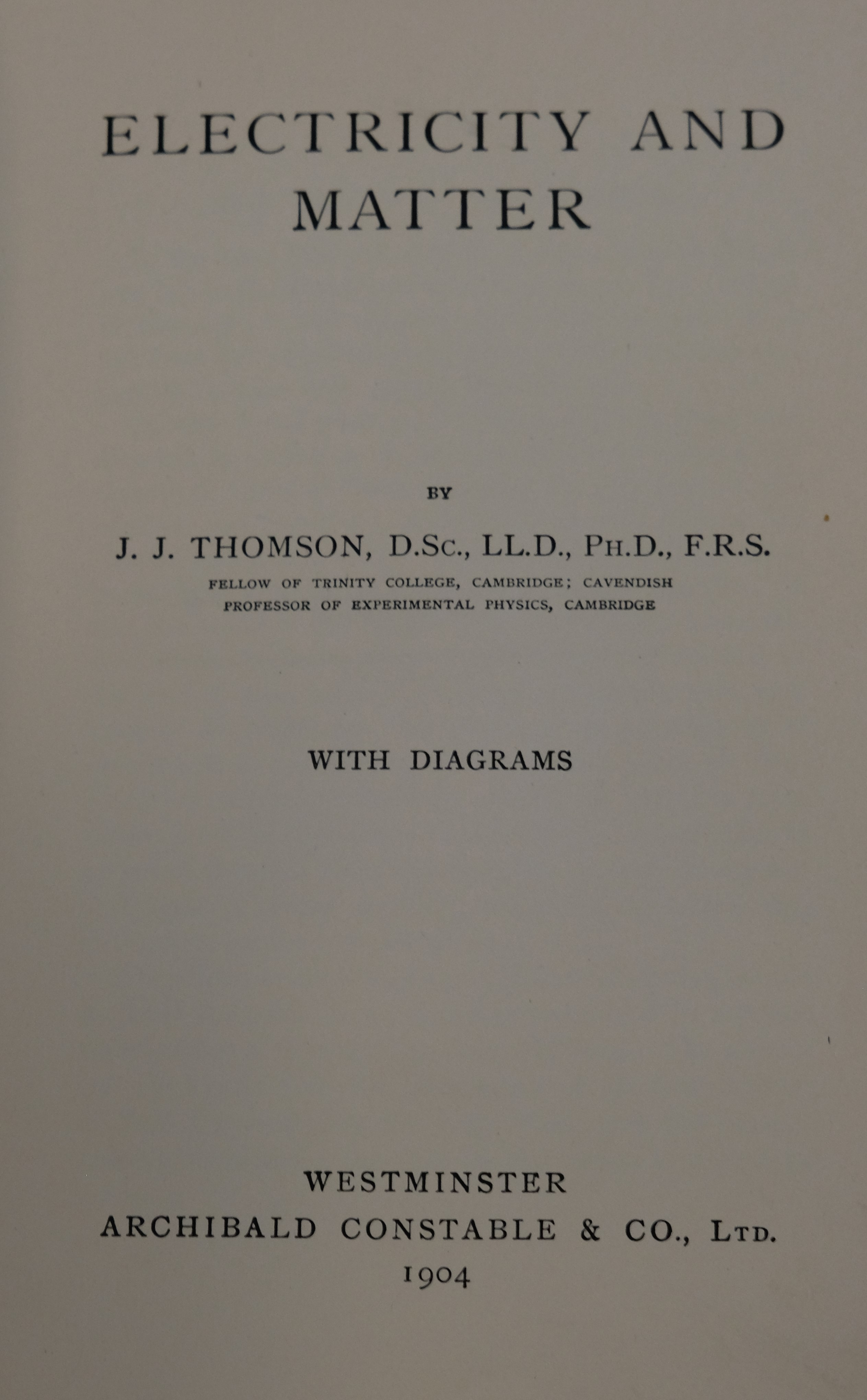
Title page to Electricity and Matter (1904)

- 1883. A Treatise on the Motion of Vortex Rings: An essay to which the Adams Prize was adjudged in 1882, in the University of Cambridge. London: Macmillan and Co., pp. 146. Recent reprint: ISBN 0-543-95696-2.
- 1888. Applications of Dynamics to Physics and Chemistry. London: Macmillan and Co., pp. 326. Recent reprint: ISBN 1-4021-8397-6.
- 1893. Notes on recent researches in electricity and magnetism: intended as a sequel to Professor Clerk-Maxwell's 'Treatise on Electricity and Magnetism'. Oxford University Press, pp. xvi & 578. 1991, Cornell University Monograph: ISBN 1-4297-4053-1.
- Thomson, Joseph John (1893). Notes on recent researches in electricity and magnetism. Oxford: Clarendon Press.
- Thomson, Joseph John (1900). Discharge of electricity through gases (in German). Leipzig: Johann Ambrosius Barth.
- Thomson, Joseph John (1904). Electricity and matter (in English). Oxford : Clarendon Press.
- Thomson, Joseph John (1905). Electricity and matter (in Italian). Milano: Hoepli.
- Thomson, Joseph John (1908). Corpuscular theory of matter (in German). Braunschweig: Vieweg und Sohn.
- 1921 (1895). Elements of the Mathematical Theory of Electricity And Magnetism. London: Macmillan and Co. Scan of 1895 edition.
- A Text book of Physics in Five Volumes, co-authored with J.H. Poynting: (1) Properties of Matter, (2) Sound, (3) Heat, (4) Light, and (5) Electricity and Magnetism. Dated 1901 and later, and with revised later editions.
- Dahl, Per F. (1997). Flash of the Cathode Rays: A History of J J Thomson's Electron. Bristol and Philadelphia: Institute of Physics Publishing. ISBN 0-7503-0453-7.
- J.J. Thomson (1897) "Cathode Rays", The Electrician 39, 104, also published in Proceedings of the Royal Institution 30 April 1897, 1–14 – first announcement of the "corpuscle" (before the classic mass and charge experiment)
- J.J. Thomson (1897), Cathode rays, Philosophical Magazine, 44, 293 – the classic measurement of the electron mass and charge
- J.J. Thomson (1904), "On the Structure of the Atom: an Investigation of the Stability and Periods of Oscillation of a number of Corpuscles arranged at equal intervals around the Circumference of a Circle; with Application of the Results to the Theory of Atomic Structure," Philosophical Magazine Series 6, Volume 7, Number 39, pp. 237–265. This paper presents the classical "plum pudding model" from which the Thomson Problem is posed.
- J. J. Thomson (1906). "On the Number of Corpuscles in an Atom" (PDF). Philosophical Magazine. 6. 11 (66): 769–781. doi:10.1080/14786440609463496.
- Joseph John Thomson (1908). On the Light Thrown by Recent Investigations on Electricity on the Relation Between Matter and Ether: The Adamson Lecture Delivered at the University on November 4, 1907. University Press.
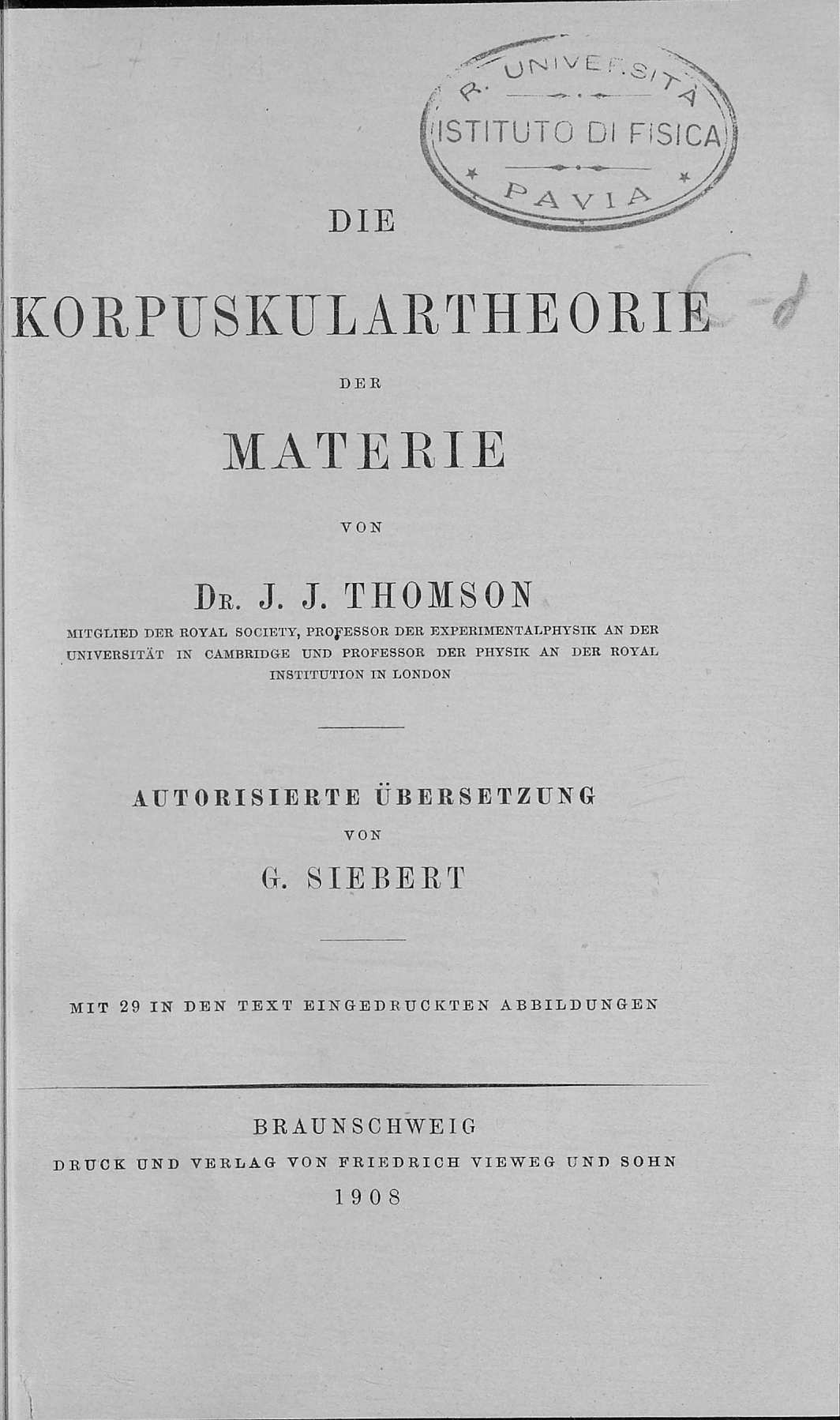
  Corpuscular theory of matter, 1908
- J.J. Thomson (1912), "Further experiments on positive rays" Philosophical Magazine, 24, 209–253 – first announcement of the two neon parabolae
- J.J. Thomson (1913), Rays of positive electricity, Proceedings of the Royal Society, A 89, 1–20 – discovery of neon isotopes
- J.J. Thomson (1923), The Electron in Chemistry: Being Five Lectures Delivered at the Franklin Institute, Philadelphia.
- Thomson, Sir J. J. (1936), Recollections and Reflections, London: G. Bell & Sons, Ltd. Republished as digital edition, Cambridge: University Press, 2011 (Cambridge Library Collection series).
- Thomson, George Paget. (1964) J.J. Thomson: Discoverer of the Electron. Great Britain: Thomas Nelson & Sons, Ltd.
- Davis, Eward Arthur & Falconer, Isobel (1997), J.J. Thomson and the Discovery of the Electron. ISBN 978-0-7484-0696-8
- Falconer, Isobel (1988) "J.J. Thomson's Work on Positive Rays, 1906–1914" Historical Studies in the Physical and Biological Sciences 18(2) 265–310
- Falconer, Isobel (2001) "Corpuscles to Electrons" in J Buchwald and A Warwick (eds) Histories of the Electron, Cambridge, Mass: MIT Press, pp. 77–100.
- Navarro, Jaume (2005). "J. J. Thomson on the Nature of Matter: Corpuscles and the Continuum". Centaurus. 47 (4): 259–282. Bibcode:2005Cent...47..259N. doi:10.1111/j.1600-0498.2005.00028.x.
- Downard, Kevin M. (2009). "J. J. Thomson goes to America". Journal of the American Society for Mass Spectrometry. 20 (11): 1964–1973. Bibcode:2009JASMS..20.1964D. doi:10.1016/j.jasms.2009.07.008. PMID 19734055. S2CID 34371775.

Academic offices
Preceded by Henry Montagu Butler	Master of Trinity College, Cambridge; 1918–1940	Succeeded by George Macaulay Trevelyan
Preceded by Lord Rayleigh	Cavendish Professor of Experimental Physics, University of Cambridge; 1884–1919	Succeeded by Ernest Rutherford
Professional and academic associations
Preceded by William Crookes	42nd President of the Royal Society; 1915–1920	Succeeded by Charles Scott Sherrington
