= Prout's hypothesis =

Early model of the atom that did not account for mass defect

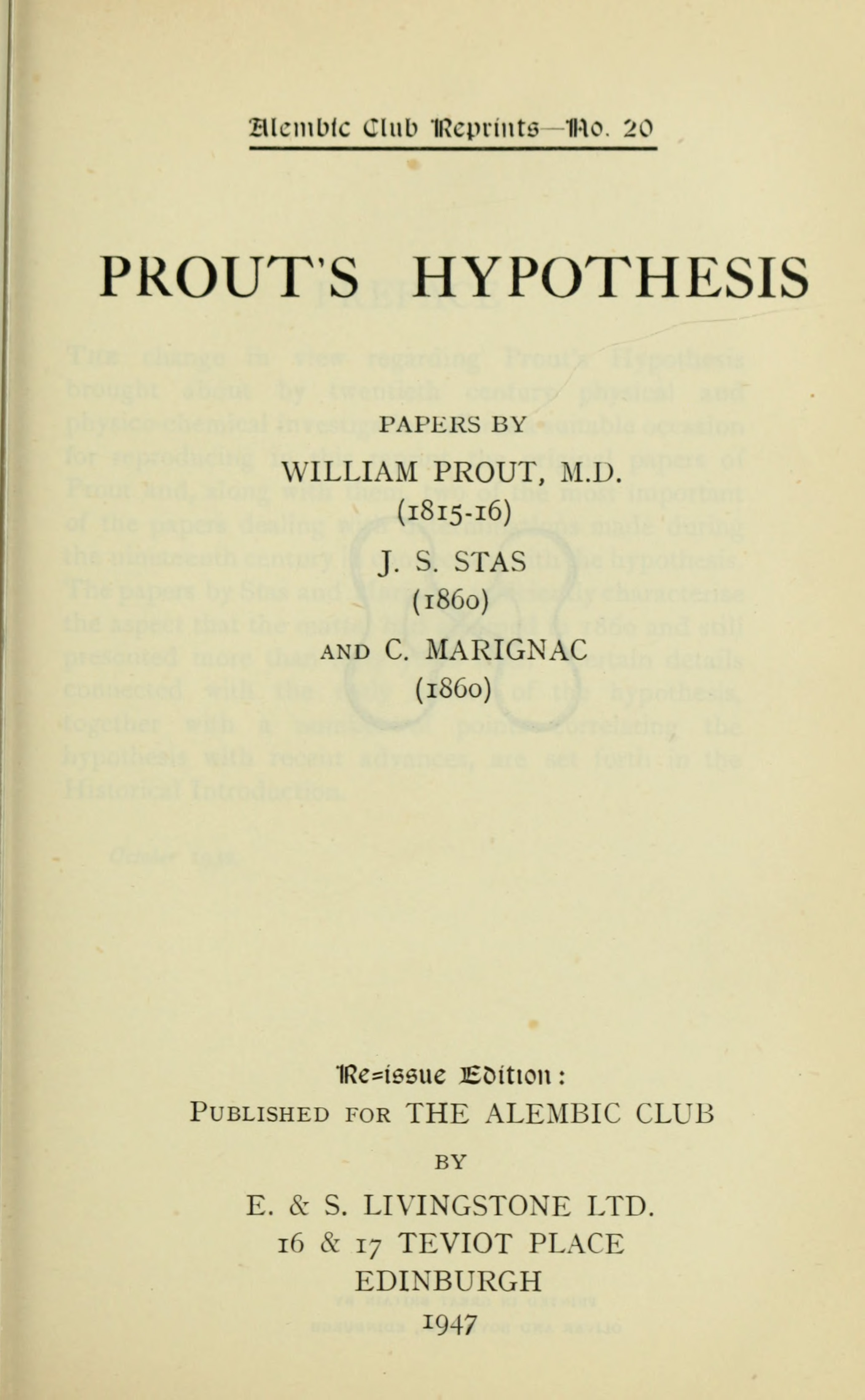
Prout's hypothesis

Prout's hypothesis was an early 19th-century attempt to explain the existence of the various chemical elements through a hypothesis regarding the internal structure of the atom. In 1815 the English chemist William Prout published two papers in which he observed that the atomic weights that had been measured for the elements known at that time appeared to be whole multiples of the atomic weight of hydrogen. In 1816, he hypothesized that the hydrogen atom was the only truly fundamental object, which he called protyle, and that the atoms of other elements were actually groupings of various numbers of hydrogen atoms.

The discrepancy between Prout's hypothesis and the known variation of some atomic weights to values far from integral multiples of hydrogen, was explained between 1913 and 1932 by the discovery of isotopes and the neutron. According to the whole number rule of Francis Aston, Prout's hypothesis is correct for atomic masses of individual isotopes, with an error of at most 1%.

== Influence ==
Prout's hypothesis remained influential in chemistry throughout the early 1800s. In 1826 Jacob Berzelius reported atomic weights significantly different from the ones that Prout used to back his claim and Edward Turner in 1832 added evidence in support of Berzelius. However other chemists such as Edward Turner in 1833 measured values that seemed to be in plausible agreement with the hypothesis.

Success of a sort continued in the 1840s. Jean-Baptiste Dumas found that synthesis of water matched the hypothesis. Jean Charles Galissard de Marignac found agreement with his more extensive measurements for silver, potassium, bromine, iodine and nitrogen. However, his atomic weight of chlorine, which is 35.45 times that of hydrogen, did not match Prout's hypothesis. To explain this, Marignac proposed the basic unit was one-half of a hydrogen atom. This change was not well received in the science community and when Dumas proposed a 0.25 unit of atomism in 1859 the concept lost additional value. Finally in 1860, Jean Stas summarized his 20 years of effort to confirm Prout's idea with rigorous but disappointing results showing the "hypothesis expressly contradicted by experiment."

Despite the ultimate failure, Prout's conjectures catalyzed more accurate and extensive measurement of atomic weights. The concept helped John Strutt and William Ramsay discover chemically inert Argon.

Prout's hypothesis was an influence on Ernest Rutherford when he succeeded in "knocking" hydrogen nuclei out of nitrogen atoms with alpha particles in 1917, and thus concluded that perhaps the nuclei of all elements were made of such particles (the hydrogen nucleus), which in 1920 he suggested be named protons, from the suffix "-on" for particles, added to the stem of Prout's word "protyle". The assumption as discussed by Rutherford was of a nucleus consisting of Z + N = A protons plus N electrons somehow trapped within thereby reducing the positive charge to +Z as observed and vaguely explaining beta decay radioactivity. Such a nuclear constitution was known to be inconsistent with dynamics either classical or early quantum but seemed inevitable until the neutron hypothesis by Rutherford and discovery by English physicist James Chadwick.

== Resolution ==
The discrepancy in the atomic weights was by 1919 suspected to be the result of the natural occurrence of multiple isotopes of the same element. F. W. Aston discovered multiple stable isotopes for numerous elements using a mass spectrograph. In 1919, Aston studied neon with sufficient resolution to show that the two isotopic masses are very close to the integers 20 and 22, and that neither is equal to the known molar mass (20.2) of neon gas.

By 1925, the problematic chlorine was found to be composed of the isotopes ^{35}Cl and ^{37}Cl, in proportions such that the average weight of natural chlorine was about 35.45 times that of hydrogen. For all elements, each individual isotope of mass number A was eventually found to have a mass very close to A times the mass of a hydrogen atom, with an error always less than 1%. This is a near miss to Prout's law being correct. Nevertheless, the rule was not found to predict isotope masses better than this for all isotopes, due mostly to mass defects resulting from release of binding energy in atomic nuclei when they are formed.

Although all elements are the product of nuclear fusion of hydrogen into higher elements, it is now understood that atoms consist of both protons (hydrogen nuclei) and neutrons. The modern version of Prout's rule is that the atomic mass of an isotope of proton number (atomic number) Z and neutron number N is equal to sum of the masses of its constituent protons and neutrons, minus the mass of the nuclear binding energy, the mass defect. According to the whole number rule proposed by Francis Aston, the mass of an isotope is roughly, but not exactly, its mass number A (Z + N) times a dalton (Da), plus or minus binding energy discrepancy – a dalton being the modern approximation for "mass of a proton, neutron, or hydrogen atom". For example iron-56 atoms (which have among the highest binding-energies) weigh only about 99.1% as much as 56 hydrogen atoms. The missing 0.9% of mass represents the energy lost when the nucleus of iron was made from hydrogen inside a star (see stellar nucleosynthesis).

== Literary allusions ==
In his 1959 novel Life and Fate (Part 1, Ch. 16), Vasily Grossman's principal character, the physicist Viktor Shtrum, reflects on Prout's hypothesis about hydrogen being the origin of other elements, and the felicitous fact that Prout's incorrect data led to an essentially correct conclusion, as he worries about his inability to formulate his own thesis.

In Herman Wouk's only work of science fiction, The Lomokome Papers, Chapter 4 refers to Prout's hypothesis when introducing "Hydrogenism", the socio-religious system of Lomokome, one of two warring civilizations on the Moon.

== See also ==
- Binding energy
