= Francis William Aston =

British chemist and physicist (1877–1945)

Francis William Aston FRS
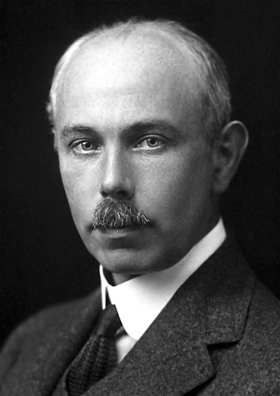
- Aston in 1922
- Born: 1 September 1877; Harborne, Birmingham, England
- Died: 20 November 1945 (aged 68); Cambridge, England
- Education: Mason College (as issued by University of London); Trinity College, Cambridge; University of Birmingham (BSc, DSc)
- Known for: Mass spectrograph Whole Number Rule; Aston Dark Space
- Awards: Mackenzie Davidson Medal (1920); Nobel Prize for Chemistry (1922); Hughes Medal (1922); John Scott Medal (1923); Paterno Medal (1923); Royal Medal (1938); Duddell Medal and Prize (1944)
- Scientific career
- Fields: Chemistry, physics
- Workplaces: Trinity College, Cambridge
- Doctoral advisor: Percy F. Frankland
- Other academic advisors: J. J. Thomson; John Henry Poynting; William A. Tilden

Francis William Aston FRS (1 September 1877 – 20 November 1945) was a British chemist and physicist who won the 1922 Nobel Prize in Chemistry for his discovery, by means of his mass spectrograph, of isotopes in many non-radioactive elements and for his enunciation of the whole number rule. He was a fellow of the Royal Society and Fellow of Trinity College, Cambridge.

== Biography ==
=== Early life ===
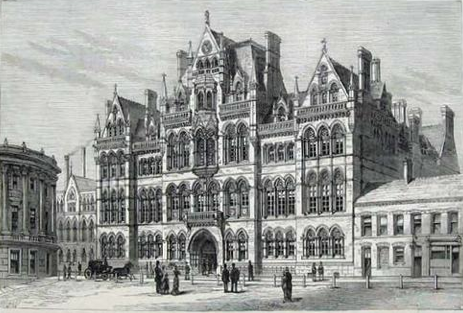
Mason College, before its incorporation into the University of Birmingham; this building was destroyed in 1964.

Francis Aston was born in Harborne, now part of Birmingham, on 1 September 1877. He was the third child and second son of William Aston and Fanny Charlotte Hollis. He was educated at the Harborne Vicarage School and later Malvern College in Worcestershire where he was a boarder. In 1893 Francis William Aston began his university studies at Mason College (which was then external college of University of London) where he was taught physics by John Henry Poynting and chemistry by Frankland and Tilden. From 1896 on he conducted additional research on organic chemistry in a private laboratory at his father's house. In 1898 he started as a student of Frankland financed by a Forster Scholarship; his work concerned optical properties of tartaric acid compounds. He started to work on fermentation chemistry at the school of brewing in Birmingham and was employed by W. Butler & Co. Brewery in 1900. This period of employment ended in 1903 when he returned to the University of Birmingham under Poynting as an Associate.

=== Research ===
With a scholarship from the University of Birmingham, he pursued research in physics following the discovery of X-rays and radioactivity in the mid-1890s. Aston studied the current through a gas-filled tube. The research, conducted with self-made discharge tubes, led him to investigate the volume of the Aston dark space.

After the death of his father, and a trip around the world in 1908, he was appointed lecturer at the University of Birmingham in 1909 but moved to the Cavendish Laboratory in Cambridge on the invitation of J. J. Thomson in 1910.

Birmingham University awarded him a BSc in Applied/Pure Science in 1910 and a DSc in Applied/Pure Science in 1914.

Joseph John Thomson revealed the nature of the cathode ray and then discovered the electron and he was now doing research on the positively charged "Kanalstrahlen" discovered by Eugen Goldstein in 1886. The method of deflecting particles in the "Kanalstrahlen" by magnetic fields was discovered by Wilhelm Wien in 1908; combining magnetic and electric fields allowed the separation of different ions by their ratio of charge and mass. Ions of a particular charge/mass ratio would leave a characteristic parabolic trace on a photographic plate, demonstrating for the first time that atoms of a single element could have different masses. The first sector field mass spectrometer was the result of these experiments.

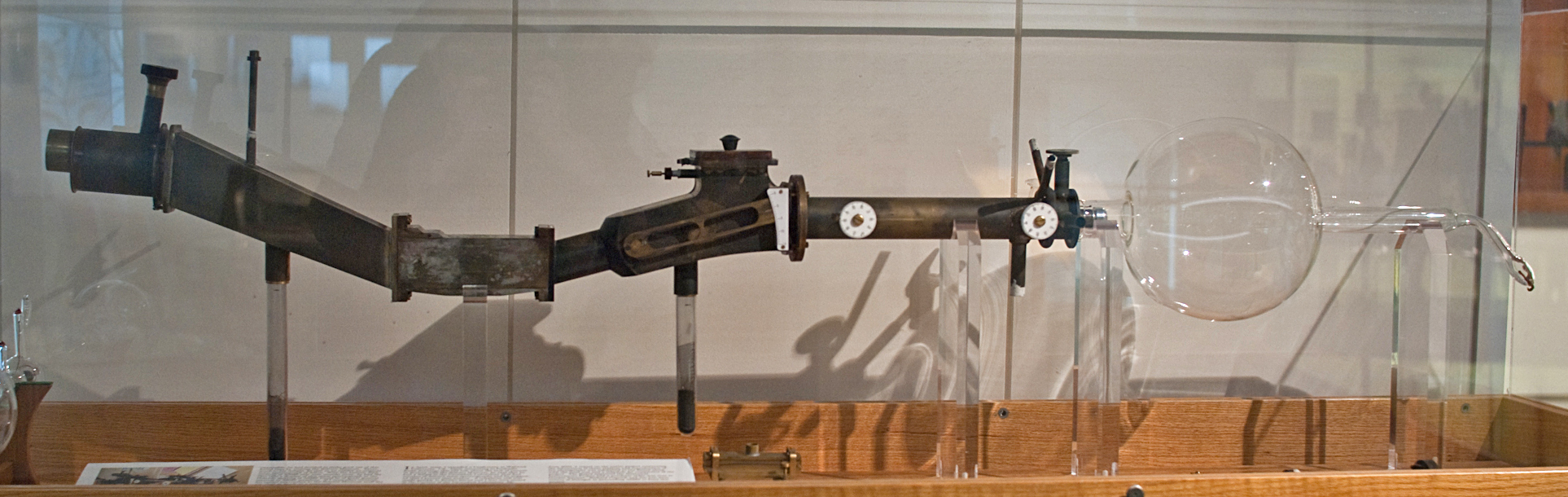
Replica of Aston's third mass spectrometer

It was speculations about isotopy that directly gave rise to the building of a mass spectrometer capable of separating the isotopes of the chemical elements. Aston initially worked on the identification of isotopes in the element neon and later chlorine and mercury.

In 1912, Aston discovered that the neon splits into two tracts, roughly corresponding to atomic mass 20 and 22. He named the mass 22 one "meta-neon", a name he took from Occult Chemistry.

First World War stalled and delayed his research on providing experimental proof for the existence of isotopes by mass spectroscopy and during the war, Aston worked at the Royal Aircraft Establishment in Farnborough as a Technical Assistant working on aeronautical coatings.

After the war, he returned to research at the Cavendish Laboratory in Cambridge and completed building his first mass spectrograph that he reported on in 1919. Subsequent improvements in the instrument led to the development of a second and third instrument of improved mass resolving power and mass accuracy. These instruments employing electromagnetic focusing allowed him to identify 212 naturally occurring isotopes. In 1921, Aston became a member of the International Committee on Atomic Weights and a fellow of the Royal Society and received the Nobel Prize in Chemistry the following year.

His work on isotopes also led to his formulation of the whole number rule which states that "the mass of the oxygen isotope being defined [as 16], all the other isotopes have masses that are very nearly whole numbers", a rule that was used extensively in the development of nuclear energy. The exact mass of many isotopes was measured leading to the result that hydrogen has a 1% higher mass than expected by the average mass of the other elements. Aston speculated about the subatomic energy and the use of it in 1936.

Isotopes and Mass-spectra and Isotopes are his most well-known books.

=== Private life and death ===
External videos
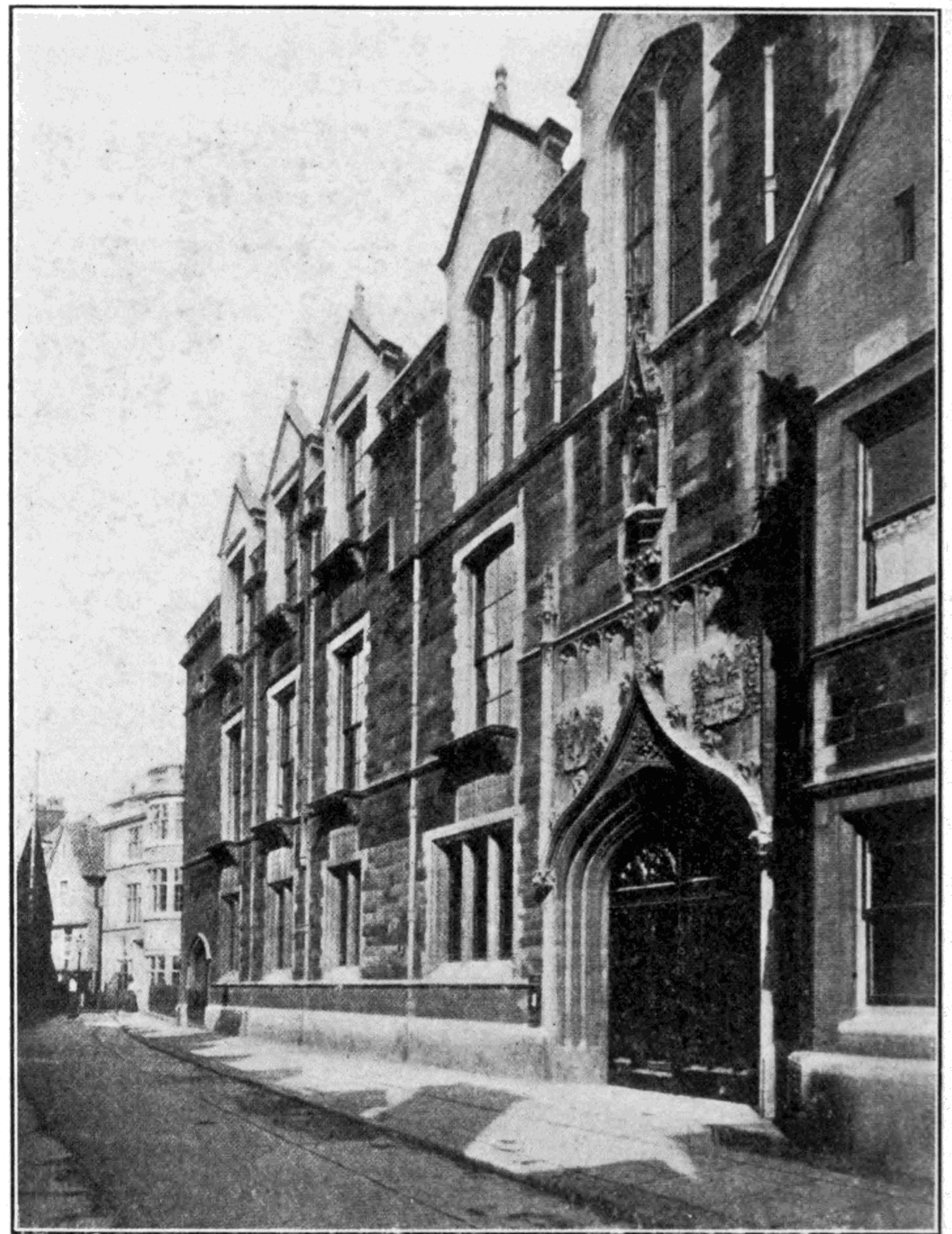
- Michael A. Grayson, Discovery of Isotopes of Elements (Part II: Francis William Aston), Profiles in Chemistry, Chemical Heritage Foundation

In his private life, he was a sportsman, cross-country skiing and skating in winter time, during his regular visits to Switzerland and Norway; deprived of these winter sports during the First World War he started climbing. Between the ages of 20 and 25 he spent a large part of his spare time cycling. With the invention of motorised vehicles he constructed a combustion engine of his own in 1902 and participated in the Gordon Bennett auto race in Ireland in 1903. Not content with these sports he also engaged in swimming, golf, especially with Rutherford and other colleagues in Cambridge, tennis, winning some prizes at open tournaments in England, Wales and Ireland and learning surfing in Honolulu in 1909. Coming from a musical family, he was capable of playing the piano, violin and cello at a level such that he regularly played in concerts at Cambridge. He visited many places around the globe on extensive travel tours starting from 1908 with a trip to Australia and New Zealand which he visited again in 1938–1939.

Aston was a skilled photographer and interested in astronomy. He joined several expeditions to study solar eclipses in Benkoeben in 1925, Sumatra in 1932, Magog in Canada on 31 August 1932 and Kamishari Hokkaido, Japan on June19th 1936. He also planned to attend expeditions to South Africa in 1940 and Brazil in 1945 in later life. He never married.

Aston died in Cambridge on 20 November 1945 at the age of 68.

== Legacy ==
The lunar crater Aston was named in his honour.

The British Mass Spectrometry Society awards the Aston Medal in his honour.
