= William Prout =

British chemist (1785–1850)

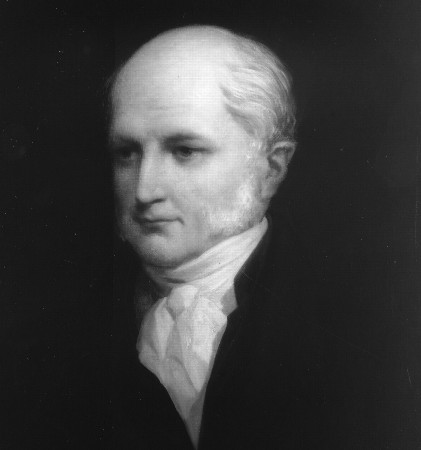
- Portrait of William Prout by Henry Wyndham Phillips
- Born: 15 January 1785; Horton, Gloucestershire, England
- Died: 9 April 1850 (aged 65); London, England
- Education: Edinburgh University (M.D.) (1811)
- Known for: Prout's hypothesis
- Awards: Copley Medal (1827)
- Scientific career
- Fields: Chemistry; Medicine

William Prout FRS (/praʊt/; 15 January 1785 – 9 April 1850) was an English chemist, physician, and natural theologian. He is known for proposing the Prout's hypothesis.

== Biography ==
Prout was born in Horton, Gloucestershire in 1785 and educated at 17 years of age by a clergyman, followed by the Redland Academy at Bristol and Edinburgh University, where he graduated in 1811 with an MD. His professional life was spent as a practising physician in London, but he also occupied himself with chemical research. He was an active worker in biological chemistry and carried out many analyses of the secretions of living organisms, which he believed were produced by the breakdown of bodily tissues. In 1823, he discovered that stomach juices contain hydrochloric acid, which can be separated from gastric juice by distillation. In 1827, he proposed the classification of substances in food into sugars and starches, oily bodies, and albumen, which would later become known as carbohydrates, fats, and proteins.

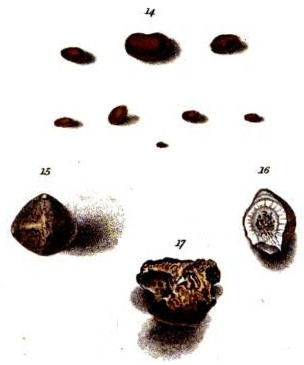
Different species of urinary calculi noted by William Prout

Prout is known for his research in physical chemistry. In 1815, based on the tables of atomic weights available at the time, he anonymously hypothesized that the atomic weight of every element is an integer multiple of that of hydrogen, suggesting that the hydrogen atom is the only truly fundamental particle (which he called protyle), and that the atoms of the other elements are made of groupings of various numbers of hydrogen atoms. While Prout's hypothesis was not borne out by later more-accurate measurements of atomic weights, it was a sufficiently fundamental insight into the structure of the atom that in 1920, Ernest Rutherford chose the name of the newly discovered proton to, among other reasons, give credit to Prout.

Prout contributed to the improvement of the barometer, and the Royal Society of London adopted his design as a national standard.

He was elected a Fellow of the Royal Society in 1819. He delivered the Goulstonian Lecture to the Royal College of Physicians in 1831 on the application of chemistry to medicine.

Prout wrote the eighth Bridgewater Treatise, Chemistry, Meteorology, and the Function of Digestion, considered with reference to Natural Theology. It was in this work that he coined the term "convection" to describe a type of energy transfer.

In 1814, Prout married Agnes Adam, daughter of Alexander Adam, of Edinburgh, Scotland, and together they had six children. Prout died in London in 1850 and was buried in Kensal Green Cemetery.

The "Prout" is a unit of nuclear binding energy, and is 1/12 the binding energy of the deuteron, or 185.5 keV. It is named after William Prout. "Proutons" was an early candidate for the name of what are now called protons.

== Honours and awards ==
- Fellow of the Royal Society (1819)
- Copley Medal (1827)
- Fellow of the Royal College of Physicians (1829)

== Bibliography ==
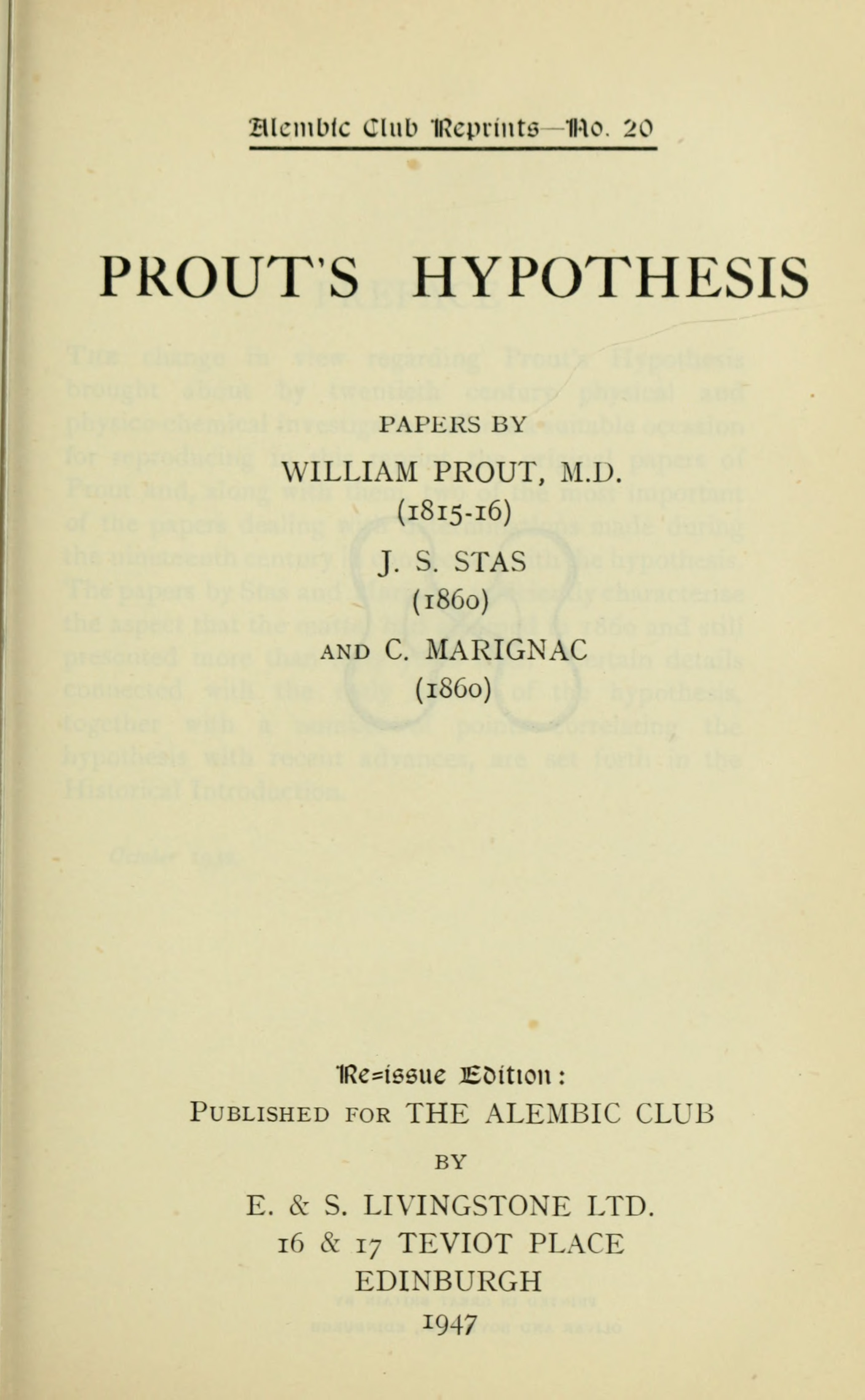
Prout's hypothesis, 1947

- Anonymous (Prout, William) (1815). "On the Relation between the Specific Gravities of Bodies in their Gaseous State and the Weights of their Atoms". Annals of Philosophy. 6: 321–330.
- Prout, William (1816). "Correction of a Mistake in the Essay on the Relation between the Specific Gravities of Bodies in their Gaseous State and the Weights of their Atoms". Annals of Philosophy. 7: 111–113.
- Prout, William (1825). An Inquiry into the Nature and Treatment of Diabetes, Calculus, and Other Affections of the Urinary Organs (2 ed.). London: Baldwin, Craddock, and Joy. "William Prout."
- Prout, William (1834). Chemistry, Meteorology, and the Function of Digestion Considered with Reference to Natural Theology; Bridgewater Treatises, W. Pickering (reissued by Cambridge University Press, 2009; ISBN 978-1-108-00066-6)
- Prout, William (1849). On the Nature and Treatment of Stomach and Urinary Diseases (3 ed.). London: John Churchill. "William Prout."
- Prout, William (1947). Prout's hypothesis. Edinburgh: Livingstone.

== See also ==
- Earl of Bridgewater (for other Bridgewater Treatises)
- Atomic number
