= Chemical law =

Law of nature relevant to chemistry

Chemical laws are those laws of nature relevant to chemistry. The most fundamental concept in chemistry is the law of conservation of mass, which states that there is no detectable change in the quantity of matter during an ordinary chemical reaction. Modern physics shows that it is actually energy that is conserved, and that energy and mass are related; a concept which becomes important in nuclear chemistry. Conservation of energy leads to the important concepts of equilibrium, thermodynamics, and kinetics.

The laws of stoichiometry, that is, the gravimetric proportions by which chemical elements participate in chemical reactions, elaborate on the law of conservation of mass. Joseph Proust's law of definite composition says that pure chemicals are composed of elements in a definite formulation.

Dalton's law of multiple proportions says that these chemicals will present themselves in proportions that are small whole numbers (i.e. 1:2 O:H in water); although in many systems (notably biomacromolecules and minerals) the ratios tend to require large numbers, and are frequently represented as a fraction. Such compounds are known as non-stoichiometric compounds.

The third stoichiometric law is the law of reciprocal proportions, which provides the basis for establishing equivalent weights for each chemical element. Elemental equivalent weights can then be used to derive atomic weights for each element.

More modern laws of chemistry define the relationship between energy and transformations.

- In equilibrium, molecules exist in mixture defined by the transformations possible on the timescale of the equilibrium, and are in a ratio defined by the intrinsic energy of the molecules—the lower the intrinsic energy, the more abundant the molecule.
- Transforming one structure to another requires the input of energy to cross an energy barrier; this can come from the intrinsic energy of the molecules themselves, or from an external source which will generally accelerate transformations. The higher the energy barrier, the slower the transformation occurs.
- There is a transition state (TS), that corresponds to the structure at the top of the energy barrier. The Hammond–Leffler postulate states that this state looks most similar to the product or starting material which has intrinsic energy closest to that of the energy barrier. Stabilizing this transition state through chemical interaction is one way to achieve catalysis.
- All chemical processes are reversible (law of microscopic reversibility) although some processes have such an energy bias, they are essentially irreversible.
