= Amount of substance =

Ratio of the number of particles in a sample to Avogadro's constant

- Approximately 1 mol amount of substance based on 12 grams of carbon-12
- Common symbols: n
- SI unit: mol
- Dimension: $\mathsf{N}$

In chemistry, the amount of substance (symbol n) in a given sample of matter is defined as a ratio (n = N/N_{A}) between the number of elementary entities (N) and the Avogadro constant (N_{A}). It is one of the seven base quantities of the International System of Units, SI. The unit of amount of substance in the SI is the mole (symbol: mol), a base unit. Since 2019, the mole has been defined such that the value of the Avogadro constant N_{A} is exactly 6.02214076×10^{23} mol^{−1}, defining a macroscopic unit convenient for use in laboratory-scale chemistry. The elementary entities are usually molecules, atoms, ions, or ion pairs of a specified kind. The particular substance sampled may be specified using a subscript or in parentheses, e.g., the amount of sodium chloride (NaCl) could be denoted as n_{NaCl} or n(NaCl). Sometimes, the amount of substance is referred to as the chemical amount or, informally, as the "number of moles" in a given sample of matter. The latter term is deprecated by the IUPAC because, for a substance X, the correct meaning of "number of moles" is n(X)/mol. The amount of substance in a sample can be calculated from measured quantities, such as mass or volume, given the molar mass of the substance or the molar volume of an ideal gas at a given temperature and pressure.

== Usage ==
Because of the way the mole and the dalton are defined, the mass in grams of one mole of a chemical compound is numerically very nearly equal to the mass of one molecule or formula unit of the compound in daltons. For example, a single molecule of water has a mass of about 18.0153 daltons on average, whereas a mole of water (which contains 6.02214076×10^{23} water molecules) has a mass of about 18.0153 grams on average. The molar mass of an isotope in grams per mole is approximately equal to the mass number. Before the mole was redefined in 2019, this equality was exact by definition for carbon-12.

In chemistry, because of the law of multiple proportions, it is often more convenient to work with amounts of substances denominated in moles, than with masses (grams) or volumes (liters). For example, the chemical fact "1 molecule of oxygen (O_{2}) will react with 2 molecules of hydrogen (H_{2}) to make 2 molecules of water (H_{2}O)" can also be stated as "1 mole of O_{2} will react with 2 moles of H_{2} to form 2 moles of water". The same chemical fact, expressed in terms of masses, would be "32.0 g of oxygen (1 mole of O_{2}) will react with approximately 4.0 g hydrogen (2 moles of H_{2}) to make approximately 36.0 g of water (2 moles of H_{2}O)" (and the numbers would depend on the isotopic composition of the reagents). In terms of volume, the numbers would depend on the pressure and temperature of the reagents and products, although the volume of an ideal gas is proportional to the amount in moles or number of molecules at constant temperature and pressure. For the same reasons, the concentrations of reagents and products in solution are often specified in moles per liter, rather than grams per liter.

The amount of substance is also a convenient concept in thermodynamics. For example, the pressure of a certain quantity of a noble gas in a recipient of a given volume, at a given temperature, is directly related to the number of molecules in the gas (through the ideal gas law), not to its mass.

This technical sense of the term "amount of substance" should not be confused with the general sense of "amount" in the English language. The latter may refer to other measurements such as mass or volume, rather than the number of particles. There are proposals to replace "amount of substance" with more easily distinguishable terms, such as enplethy and stoichiometric amount.

The IUPAC recommends that "amount of substance" should be used instead of "number of moles", just as the quantity mass should not be called "number of (kilo)grams".

== Nature of the particles ==
To avoid ambiguity, the nature of the particles should be specified in any measurement of the amount of substance: thus, a sample of 1 mol of molecules of oxygen (O_{2}) has a mass of about 32.00 g, whereas a sample of 1 mol of atoms of oxygen (O) has a mass of about 16.00 g.

== Derived quantities ==
=== Molar quantities (per mole) ===
A diagram comparing moles and molar masses of iron and gold samples that have equal masses

The quotient of some extensive physical quantity of a homogeneous sample by its amount of substance is an intensive property of the substance, usually named by the prefix "molar" or the suffix "per mole".

For example, the quotient of the mass of a sample by its amount of substance is its molar mass, for which the SI unit kilogram per mole or gram per mole may be used. This is about 18.015 g/mol for water, and 55.845 g/mol for iron. Similarly for volume, one gets the molar volume, which is about 18.069 millilitres per mole for liquid water and 7.092 mL/mol for iron at room temperature. From the heat capacity, one gets the molar heat capacity, which is about 75.385 J/(K⋅mol) for water and about 25.10 J/(K⋅mol) for iron.

==== Molar mass and molar volume ====
The molar mass ($M$) of a substance is the ratio of the mass ($m$) of a sample of that substance to its amount of substance ($n$): $M=m/n$. For most practical purposes, the numerical value of the molar mass in grams per mole is the same as that of the mean mass of one molecule or formula unit of the substance in daltons, as the mole was historically defined such that the molar mass constant was exactly 1 g/mol. Thus, given the molecular mass or formula mass in daltons, the same number in grams gives an amount very close to the mass of one mole of the substance. For example, the average molecular mass of water is about 18.015 Da and the molar mass of water is about 18.015 g/mol. This allows for accurate determination of the amount in moles of a substance by measuring its mass and dividing by the molar mass of the compound: $n=m/M$. For example, a mass of 100 g of water corresponds to an amount of about 5.5509 mol of water.

The molar mass of a substance depends not only on its molecular formula, but also on the distribution of isotopes of each chemical element present in it. For example, the molar mass of calcium-40 is 39.96259098(22) g/mol, whereas the molar mass of calcium-42 is 41.95861801(27) g/mol, and of calcium with the normal isotopic mix is 40.078(4) g/mol.

Other methods of determining the amount of substance include the use of the molar volume ($V_m$) for ideal gases at a given temperature $T$ and pressure $P$ (through the relationship $V_m = V/n = RT/P$) or the measurement of electric charge (using Faraday's laws of electrolysis). For example, the molar volume of an ideal gas under standard conditions of 0 °C (273.15 K) and 1 atm (101.325 kPa) is about 22.414 L/mol, and 1 m^{3} of an ideal gas under the same conditions is about 44.615 mol of gas.

=== Amount (molar) concentration (moles per liter) ===
Another important derived quantity is the molar concentration ($c$) (also called amount of substance concentration, amount concentration, or substance concentration, especially in clinical chemistry), defined as the amount in moles ($n$) of a specific substance (solute in a solution or component of a mixture), divided by the volume ($V$) of the solution or mixture: $c=n/V$.

The standard SI unit of this quantity is mol/m^{3}, although more practical units are commonly used, such as mole per liter (mol/L, equivalent to mol/dm^{3}). For example, the amount concentration of sodium chloride in ocean water is typically about 0.599 mol/L.

The denominator is the volume of the solution, not of the solvent. Thus, for example, one liter of standard vodka contains about 0.40 L of ethanol (315 g, 6.85 mol) and 0.60 L of water. The amount concentration of ethanol is therefore (6.85 mol of ethanol)/(1 L of vodka) = 6.85 mol/L, not (6.85 mol of ethanol)/(0.60 L of water), which would be 11.4 mol/L.

In chemistry, it is customary to read the unit "mol/L" as molar, and denote it by the symbol "M" (both following the numeric value). Thus, for example, each liter of a "0.5 molar" or "0.5 M" solution of urea (CH_{4}N_{2}O) in water contains 0.5 moles of that molecule. By extension, the amount concentration is also commonly called the molarity of the substance of interest in the solution. However, as of May 2007, these terms and symbols are not condoned by IUPAC.

This quantity should not be confused with the mass concentration, which is the mass of the substance of interest divided by the volume of the solution (about 35 g/L for sodium chloride in ocean water).

=== Amount (molar) fraction (moles per mole) ===
Confusingly, the amount (molar) concentration should also be distinguished from the molar fraction (also called mole fraction or amount fraction) of a substance in a mixture (such as a solution), which is the number of moles of the compound in one sample of the mixture, divided by the total number of moles of all components. For example, if 20 g of NaCl is dissolved in 100 g of water, the amounts of the two substances in the solution will be (20 g)/(58.443 g/mol) = 0.34221 mol and (100 g)/(18.015 g/mol) = 5.5509 mol, respectively; and the molar fraction of NaCl will be 0.34221/(0.34221 + 5.5509) = 0.05807.

In a mixture of gases, the partial pressure of each component is proportional to its molar fraction.

== History ==
The alchemists, and especially the early metallurgists, probably had some notion of amount of substance, but there are no surviving records of any generalization of the idea beyond a set of recipes. In 1758, Mikhail Lomonosov questioned the idea that mass was the only measure of the quantity of matter, but he did so only in relation to his theories on gravitation. The development of the concept of amount of substance was coincidental with, and vital to, the birth of modern chemistry.

- 1777: Wenzel publishes Lessons on Affinity, in which he demonstrates that the proportions of the "base component" and the "acid component" (cation and anion in modern terminology) remain the same during reactions between two neutral salts.
- 1789: Lavoisier publishes Treatise of Elementary Chemistry, introducing the concept of a chemical element and clarifying the law of conservation of mass for chemical reactions.
- 1792: Richter publishes the first volume of Stoichiometry or the Art of Measuring the Chemical Elements (publication of subsequent volumes continues until 1802). The term "stoichiometry" is used for the first time. The first tables of equivalent weights are published for acid–base reactions. Richter also notes that, for a given acid, the equivalent mass of the acid is proportional to the mass of oxygen in the base.
- 1794: Proust's law of definite proportions generalizes the concept of equivalent weights to all types of chemical reaction, not simply acid–base reactions.
- 1805: Dalton publishes his first paper on modern atomic theory, including a "Table of the relative weights of the ultimate particles of gaseous and other bodies".
  The concept of atoms raised the question of their weight. While many were skeptical about the reality of atoms, chemists quickly found atomic weights to be an invaluable tool in expressing stoichiometric relationships.
- 1808: Publication of Dalton's A New System of Chemical Philosophy, containing the first table of atomic weights (based on H = 1).
- 1809: Gay-Lussac's law of combining volumes, stating an integer relationship between the volumes of reactants and products in the chemical reactions of gases.
- 1811: Avogadro hypothesizes that equal volumes of different gases (at same temperature and pressure) contain equal numbers of particles, now known as Avogadro's law.
- 1813/1814: Berzelius publishes the first of several tables of atomic weights based on the scale of m(O) = 100.
- 1815: Prout publishes his hypothesis that all atomic weights are integer multiple of the atomic weight of hydrogen. The hypothesis is later abandoned given the observed atomic weight of chlorine (approx. 35.5 relative to hydrogen).
- 1819: Dulong–Petit law relating the atomic weight of a solid element to its specific heat capacity.
- 1819: Mitscherlich's work on crystal isomorphism allows many chemical formulae to be clarified, resolving several ambiguities in the calculation of atomic weights.
- 1834: Clapeyron states the ideal gas law.
  The ideal gas law was the first to be discovered of many relationships between the number of atoms or molecules in a system and other physical properties of the system, apart from its mass. However, this was not sufficient to convince all scientists of the existence of atoms and molecules, many considered it simply being a useful tool for calculation.
- 1834: Faraday states his laws of electrolysis, in particular that "the chemical decomposing action of a current is constant for a constant quantity of electricity".
- 1856: Krönig derives the ideal gas law from kinetic theory. Clausius publishes an independent derivation the following year.
- 1860: The Karlsruhe Congress debates the relation between "physical molecules", "chemical molecules" and atoms, without reaching consensus.
- 1865: Loschmidt makes the first estimate of the size of gas molecules and hence of number of molecules in a given volume of gas, now known as the Loschmidt constant.
- 1886: van't Hoff demonstrates the similarities in behaviour between dilute solutions and ideal gases.
- 1886: Eugen Goldstein observes discrete particle rays in gas discharges, laying the foundation of mass spectrometry, a tool subsequently used to establish the masses of atoms and molecules.
- 1887: Arrhenius describes the dissociation of electrolyte in solution, resolving one of the problems in the study of colligative properties.
- 1893: First recorded use of the term mole to describe a unit of amount of substance by Ostwald in a university textbook.
- 1897: First recorded use of the term mole in English.
- By the turn of the twentieth century, the concept of atomic and molecular entities was generally accepted, but many questions remained, not least the size of atoms and their number in a given sample. The concurrent development of mass spectrometry, starting in 1886, supported the concept of atomic and molecular mass and provided a tool of direct relative measurement.
- 1905: Einstein's paper on Brownian motion dispels any last doubts on the physical reality of atoms, and opens the way for an accurate determination of their mass.
- 1909: Perrin coins the name Avogadro constant and estimates its value.
- 1913: Discovery of isotopes of non-radioactive elements by Soddy and Thomson.
- 1914: Richards receives the Nobel Prize in Chemistry for "his determinations of the atomic weight of a large number of elements".
- 1920: Aston proposes the whole number rule, an updated version of Prout's hypothesis.
- 1921: Soddy receives the Nobel Prize in Chemistry "for his work on the chemistry of radioactive substances and investigations into isotopes".
- 1922: Aston receives the Nobel Prize in Chemistry "for his discovery of isotopes in a large number of non-radioactive elements, and for his whole-number rule".
- 1926: Perrin receives the Nobel Prize in Physics, in part for his work in measuring the Avogadro constant.
- 1959/1960: Unified atomic mass unit scale based on m(^{12}C) = 12 u adopted by IUPAP and IUPAC.
- 1968: The mole is recommended for inclusion in the International System of Units (SI) by the International Committee for Weights and Measures (CIPM).
- 1972: The mole is approved as the SI base unit of amount of substance.
- 2019: The mole is redefined in the SI as "the amount of substance of a system that contains 6.02214076×10^{23} specified elementary entities".

== See also ==
- International System of Quantities
- Quantity of matter

Quantity			SI unit	
Name	Symbol	Dimension symbol	Unit name	Unit symbol
time, duration	t	T	second	s
length	l, x, r, etc.	L	metre	m
mass	m	M	kilogram	kg
electric current	I , i	I	ampere	A
thermodynamic temperature	T	Θ	kelvin	K
amount of substance	n	N	mole	mol
luminous intensity	I_{v}	J	candela	cd
