= Scientific law =

Statement based on repeated empirical observations that describes some natural phenomenon

Scientific laws or laws of science are statements, based on repeated experiments or observations, that describe or predict a range of natural phenomena. The term law has diverse usage in many cases (approximate, accurate, broad, or narrow) across all fields of natural science (physics, chemistry, astronomy, geoscience, biology). Laws are developed from data and can be further developed through mathematics; in all cases they are directly or indirectly based on empirical evidence. It is generally understood that they implicitly reflect, though they do not explicitly assert, causal relationships fundamental to reality, and are discovered rather than invented.

Scientific laws summarize the results of experiments or observations, usually within a certain range of application. In general, the accuracy of a law does not change when a new theory of the relevant phenomenon is worked out, but rather the scope of the law's application, since the mathematics or statement representing the law does not change. As with other kinds of scientific knowledge, scientific laws do not express absolute certainty, as mathematical laws do. A scientific law may be contradicted, restricted, or extended by future observations.

A law can often be formulated as one or several statements or equations, so that it can predict the outcome of an experiment. Laws differ from hypotheses and postulates, which are proposed during the scientific process before and during validation by experiment and observation. Hypotheses and postulates are not laws, since they have not been verified to the same degree, although they may lead to the formulation of laws. Laws are narrower in scope than scientific theories, which may entail one or several laws. Science distinguishes a law or theory from facts. Calling a law a fact is ambiguous, an overstatement, or an equivocation. The nature of scientific laws has been much discussed in philosophy, but scientific laws are empirical conclusions reached by the scientific method; they are intended to be neither laden with ontological commitments nor statements of logical absolutes.

Social sciences such as economics have also attempted to formulate scientific laws, though these generally have much less predictive power.

== Overview ==
A scientific law always applies to a physical system under repeated conditions, and it implies that there is a causal relationship involving the elements of the system. Factual and well-confirmed statements like "Mercury is liquid at standard temperature and pressure" are considered too specific to qualify as scientific laws. A central problem in the philosophy of science, going back to David Hume, is that of distinguishing causal relationships (such as those implied by laws) from principles that arise due to constant conjunction.

Laws differ from scientific theories in that they do not posit a mechanism or explanation of phenomena: they are merely distillations of the results of repeated observation. As such, the applicability of a law is limited to circumstances resembling those already observed, and the law may be found to be false when extrapolated. Ohm's law only applies to linear networks; Newton's law of universal gravitation only applies in weak gravitational fields; the early laws of aerodynamics, such as Bernoulli's principle, do not apply in the case of compressible flow such as occurs in transonic and supersonic flight; Hooke's law only applies to strain below the elastic limit; Boyle's law applies with perfect accuracy only to the ideal gas, etc. These laws remain useful, but only under the specified conditions where they apply.

Many laws take mathematical forms, and thus can be stated as an equation; for example, the law of conservation of energy can be written as ΔE = 0, where E is the total amount of energy in the universe. Similarly, the first law of thermodynamics can be written as dU = δQ − δW, and Newton's second law can be written as F = dp/dt. While these scientific laws explain what our senses perceive, they are still empirical (acquired by observation or scientific experiment) and so are not like mathematical theorems which can be proved purely by mathematics.

Like theories and hypotheses, laws make predictions; specifically, they predict that new observations will conform to the given law. Laws can be falsified if they are found in contradiction with new data.

Some laws are only approximations of other more general laws, and are good approximations with a restricted domain of applicability. For example, Newtonian dynamics (which is based on Galilean transformations) is the low-speed limit of special relativity (since the Galilean transformation is the low-speed approximation to the Lorentz transformation). Similarly, the Newtonian gravitation law is a low-mass approximation of general relativity, and Coulomb's law is an approximation to quantum electrodynamics at large distances (compared to the range of weak interactions). In such cases it is common to use the simpler, approximate versions of the laws, instead of the more accurate general laws.

Laws are constantly being tested experimentally to increasing degrees of precision, which is one of the main goals of science. The fact that laws have never been observed to be violated does not preclude testing them at increased accuracy or in new kinds of conditions to confirm whether they continue to hold, or whether they break, and what can be discovered in the process. It is always possible for laws to be invalidated or proven to have limitations, by repeatable experimental evidence, should any be observed. Well-established laws have indeed been invalidated in some special cases, but the new formulations created to explain the discrepancies generalize upon, rather than overthrow, the originals. That is, the invalidated laws have been found to be only close approximations, to which other terms or factors must be added to cover previously unaccounted-for conditions, e.g. very large or very small scales of time or space, enormous speeds or masses, etc. This, rather than unchanging knowledge, physical laws are better viewed as a series of improving and more precise generalizations.

== Properties ==
Scientific laws are typically conclusions based on repeated scientific experiments and observations over many years and which have become accepted universally within the scientific community. A scientific law is "inferred from particular facts, applicable to a defined group or class of phenomena, and expressible by the statement that a particular phenomenon always occurs if certain conditions be present". The production of a summary description of our environment in the form of such laws is a fundamental aim of science.

Several general properties of scientific laws, particularly when referring to laws in physics, have been identified. Scientific laws are:

- True, at least within their regime of validity. By definition, there have never been repeatable contradicting observations.
- Universal. They appear to apply everywhere in the universe.
- Simple. They are typically expressed in terms of a single mathematical equation.
- Absolute. Nothing in the universe appears to affect them.
- Stable. Unchanged since first discovered (although they may have been shown to be approximations of more accurate laws),
- All-encompassing. Everything in the universe apparently must comply with them (according to observations).
- Generally conservative of quantity.
- Often expressions of existing homogeneities (symmetries) of space and time.
- Typically theoretically reversible in time (if non-quantum), although time itself is irreversible.
- Broad. In physics, laws exclusively refer to the broad domain of matter, motion, energy, and force itself, rather than more specific systems in the universe, such as living systems, e.g. the mechanics of the human body.

The term "scientific law" is traditionally associated with the natural sciences, though the social sciences also contain laws. For example, Zipf's law is a law in the social sciences which is based on mathematical statistics. In these cases, laws may describe general trends or expected behaviors rather than being absolutes.

In natural science, impossibility assertions come to be widely accepted as overwhelmingly probable rather than considered proved to the point of being unchallengeable. The basis for this strong acceptance is a combination of extensive evidence of something not occurring, combined with an underlying theory, very successful in making predictions, whose assumptions lead logically to the conclusion that something is impossible. While an impossibility assertion in natural science can never be absolutely proved, it could be refuted by the observation of a single counterexample. Such a counterexample would require that the assumptions underlying the theory that implied the impossibility be re-examined.

Some examples of widely accepted impossibilities in physics are perpetual motion machines, which violate the law of conservation of energy, exceeding the speed of light, which violates the implications of special relativity, the uncertainty principle of quantum mechanics, which asserts the impossibility of simultaneously knowing both the position and the momentum of a particle, and Bell's theorem: no physical theory of local hidden variables can ever reproduce all of the predictions of quantum mechanics.

== Laws as consequences of mathematical symmetries ==
Some laws reflect mathematical symmetries found in nature (e.g. the Pauli exclusion principle reflects identity of electrons, conservation laws reflect homogeneity of space, time, and Lorentz transformations reflect rotational symmetry of spacetime). Many fundamental physical laws are mathematical consequences of various symmetries of space, time, or other aspects of nature. Specifically, Noether's theorem connects some conservation laws to certain symmetries. For example, conservation of energy is a consequence of the shift symmetry of time (no moment of time is different from any other), while conservation of momentum is a consequence of the symmetry (homogeneity) of space (no place in space is special, or different from any other). The indistinguishability of all particles of each fundamental type (say, electrons, or photons) results in the Dirac and Bose quantum statistics which in turn result in the Pauli exclusion principle for fermions and in Bose–Einstein condensation for bosons. Special relativity uses rapidity to express motion according to the symmetries of hyperbolic rotation, a transformation mixing space and time. Symmetry between inertial and gravitational mass results in general relativity.

The inverse square law of interactions mediated by massless bosons is the mathematical consequence of the 3-dimensionality of space.

One strategy in the search for the most fundamental laws of nature is to search for the most general mathematical symmetry group that can be applied to the fundamental interactions.

== Laws of physics ==
=== Conservation laws ===
==== Conservation and symmetry ====
Conservation laws are fundamental laws that follow from the homogeneity of space, time and phase, in other words symmetry.

- Noether's theorem: Any quantity with a continuously differentiable symmetry in the action has an associated conservation law.
- Conservation of mass was the first law to be understood since most macroscopic physical processes involving masses, for example, collisions of massive particles or fluid flow, provide the apparent belief that mass is conserved. Mass conservation was observed to be true for all chemical reactions. In general, this is only approximative because with the advent of relativity and experiments in nuclear and particle physics: mass can be transformed into energy and vice versa, so mass is not always conserved but part of the more general conservation of mass–energy.
- Conservation of energy, momentum and angular momentum for isolated systems can be found to be symmetries in time, translation, and rotation.
- Conservation of charge was also realized since charge has never been observed to be created or destroyed and only found to move from place to place.

==== Continuity and transfer ====
Conservation laws can be expressed using the general continuity equation (for a conserved quantity) can be written in differential form as:

$$\frac{\partial \rho}{\partial t}=-\nabla \cdot \mathbf{J}$$

where ρ is some quantity per unit volume, J is the flux of that quantity (change in quantity per unit time per unit area). Intuitively, the divergence (denoted ∇⋅) of a vector field is a measure of flux diverging radially outwards from a point, so the negative is the amount piling up at a point; hence the rate of change of density in a region of space must be the amount of flux leaving or collecting in some region (see the main article for details). In the table below, the fluxes flows for various physical quantities in transport, and their associated continuity equations, are collected for comparison.

Physics, conserved quantity	Conserved quantity q	Volume density ρ (of q)	Flux J (of q)	Equation
Hydrodynamics, fluids	m = mass (kg)	ρ = volumic mass density (kg⋅m^{−3})	ρ u, where u = velocity field of fluid (m⋅s^{−1})	$\frac{\partial \rho}{\partial t} = - \nabla \cdot (\rho \mathbf{u})$
Electromagnetism, electric charge	q = electric charge (C)	ρ = volumic electric charge density (C⋅m^{−3})	J = electric current density (A⋅m^{−2})	$\frac{\partial \rho}{\partial t} = - \nabla \cdot \mathbf{J}$
Thermodynamics, energy	E = energy (J)	u = volumic energy density (J⋅m^{−3})	q = heat flux (W⋅m^{−2})	$\frac{\partial u}{\partial t}=- \nabla \cdot \mathbf{q}$
Quantum mechanics, probability	Ψ|^{2}d^{3}r = probability distribution	Ψ|^{2} = probability density function (m^{−3}), Ψ = wavefunction of quantum system	j = probability current/flux	$\frac{\partial |\Psi|^2}{\partial t}=-\nabla \cdot \mathbf{j}$

More general equations are the convection–diffusion equation and Boltzmann transport equation, which have their roots in the continuity equation.

=== Laws of classical mechanics ===
==== Principle of least action ====
Classical mechanics, including Newton's laws, Lagrange's equations, Hamilton's equations, etc., can be derived from the following principle:

$$\delta \mathcal{S} = \delta\int_{t_1}^{t_2} L(\mathbf{q}, \mathbf{\dot{q}}, t) \, dt = 0$$

where $\mathcal{S}$ is the action; the integral of the Lagrangian

$$L(\mathbf{q}, \mathbf{\dot{q}}, t) = T(\mathbf{\dot{q}}, t)-V(\mathbf{q}, \mathbf{\dot{q}}, t)$$

of the physical system between two times t_{1} and t_{2}. The kinetic energy of the system is T (a function of the rate of change of the configuration of the system), and potential energy is V (a function of the configuration and its rate of change). The configuration of a system which has N degrees of freedom is defined by generalized coordinates q = (q_{1}, q_{2}, ... q_{N}).

There are generalized momenta conjugate to these coordinates, p = (p_{1}, p_{2}, ..., p_{N}), where:

$$p_i = \frac{\partial L}{\partial \dot{q}_i}$$

The action and Lagrangian both contain the dynamics of the system for all times. The term "path" simply refers to a curve traced out by the system in terms of the generalized coordinates in the configuration space, i.e. the curve q(t), parameterized by time (see also Parametric equation).

The action is a functional rather than a function, since it depends on the Lagrangian, and the Lagrangian depends on the path q(t), so the action depends on the entire "shape" of the path for all times (in the time interval from t_{1} to t_{2}). Between two instants of time, there are infinitely many paths, but one for which the action is stationary (to the first order) is the true path. The stationary value for the entire continuum of Lagrangian values corresponding to some path, not just one value of the Lagrangian, is required (in other words it is not as simple as "differentiating a function and setting it to zero, then solving the equations to find the points of maxima and minima etc.", rather this idea is applied to the entire "shape" of the function, see calculus of variations for more details on this procedure).

Notice L is not the total energy E of the system due to the difference, rather than the sum:

$$E=T+V$$

The following general approaches to classical mechanics are summarized below in the order of establishment. They are equivalent formulations. Newton's is commonly used due to simplicity, but Hamilton's and Lagrange's equations are more general, and their range can extend into other branches of physics with suitable modifications.

Laws of motion
Principle of least action: $\mathcal{S} = \int_{t_1}^{t_2} L \,\mathrm{d}t \,\!$
The Euler–Lagrange equations are: $$\frac{\mathrm{d}}{\mathrm{d} t} \left ( \frac{\partial L}{\partial \dot{q}_i } \right ) = \frac{\partial L}{\partial q_i}$$ Using the definition of generalized momentum, there is the symmetry: $$p_i = \frac{\partial L}{\partial \dot{q}_i}\quad \dot{p}_i = \frac{\partial L}{\partial {q}_i}$$	Hamilton's equations $\dfrac{\partial \mathbf{p}}{\partial t} = -\dfrac{\partial H}{\partial \mathbf{q}}$ $\dfrac{\partial \mathbf{q}}{\partial t} = \dfrac{\partial H}{\partial \mathbf{p}}$ The Hamiltonian as a function of generalized coordinates and momenta has the general form: $$H (\mathbf{q}, \mathbf{p}, t) = \mathbf{p}\cdot\mathbf{\dot{q}}-L$$
The Euler–Lagrange equations are: $$\frac{\mathrm{d}}{\mathrm{d} t} \left ( \frac{\partial L}{\partial \dot{q}_i } \right ) = \frac{\partial L}{\partial q_i}$$ Using the definition of generalized momentum, there is the symmetry: $$p_i = \frac{\partial L}{\partial \dot{q}_i}\quad \dot{p}_i = \frac{\partial L}{\partial {q}_i}$$	Hamilton–Jacobi equation $$H \left(\mathbf{q}, \frac{\partial S}{\partial\mathbf{q}}, t\right) = -\frac{\partial S}{\partial t}$$
Newton's laws Newton's laws of motion They are low-limit solutions to relativity. Alternative formulations of Newtonian mechanics are Lagrangian and Hamiltonian mechanics. The laws can be summarized by two equations (since the 1st is a special case of the 2nd, zero resultant acceleration): $$\mathbf{F} = \frac{\mathrm{d}\mathbf{p}}{\mathrm{d}t}, \quad \mathbf{F}_{ij}=-\mathbf{F}_{ji}$$ where p = momentum of body, F_{ij} = force on body i by body j, F_{ji} = force on body j by body i. For a dynamical system the two equations (effectively) combine into one: $$\frac{\mathrm{d}\mathbf{p}_\mathrm{i}}{\mathrm{d}t} = \mathbf{F}_\text{E} + \sum_{i \neq j} \mathbf{F}_{ij}$$ in which F_{E} = resultant external force (due to any agent not part of system). Body i does not exert a force on itself.

From the above, any equation of motion in classical mechanics can be derived.

Corollaries in mechanics:

- Euler's laws of motion
- Euler's equations (rigid body dynamics)

Corollaries in fluid mechanics:

Equations describing fluid flow in various situations can be derived, using the above classical equations of motion and often conservation of mass, energy and momentum. Some elementary examples follow.

- Archimedes' principle
- Bernoulli's principle
- Poiseuille's law
- Stokes' law
- Navier–Stokes equations
- Faxén's law

=== Laws of gravitation and relativity ===
Some of the more famous laws of nature are found in Isaac Newton's theories of (now) classical mechanics, presented in his Philosophiae Naturalis Principia Mathematica, and in Albert Einstein's theory of relativity.

==== Modern laws ====
Special relativity:

The two postulates of special relativity are not "laws" in themselves, but assumptions of their nature in terms of relative motion.

They can be stated as "the laws of physics are the same in all inertial frames" and "the speed of light is constant and has the same value in all inertial frames".

The said postulates lead to the Lorentz transformations – the transformation law between two frame of references moving relative to each other. For any 4-vector

$$A' =\Lambda A$$

this replaces the Galilean transformation law from classical mechanics. The Lorentz transformations reduce to the Galilean transformations for low velocities much less than the speed of light c.

The magnitudes of 4-vectors are invariants – not "conserved", but the same for all inertial frames (i.e. every observer in an inertial frame will agree on the same value), in particular if A is the four-momentum, the magnitude can derive the famous invariant equation for mass–energy and momentum conservation (see invariant mass):

$$E^2 = (pc)^2 + (mc^2)^2$$

in which the (more famous) mass–energy equivalence E = mc^{2} is a special case.

General relativity:

General relativity is governed by the Einstein field equations, which describe the curvature of space-time due to mass-energy equivalent to the gravitational field. Solving the equation for the geometry of space warped due to the mass distribution gives the metric tensor. Using the geodesic equation, the motion of masses falling along the geodesics can be calculated.

Gravitoelectromagnetism:

In a relatively flat spacetime due to weak gravitational fields, gravitational analogues of Maxwell's equations can be found; the GEM equations, to describe an analogous gravitomagnetic field. They are well established by the theory, and experimental tests form ongoing research.

Einstein field equations (EFE): $$R_{\mu \nu} + \left ( \Lambda - \frac{R}{2} \right ) g_{\mu \nu} = \frac{8 \pi G}{c^4} T_{\mu \nu}\,\!$$ where Λ = cosmological constant, R_{μν} = Ricci curvature tensor, T_{μν} = stress–energy tensor, g_{μν} = metric tensor	Geodesic equation: $$\frac{{\rm d}^2x^\lambda }{{\rm d}t^2} + \Gamma^{\lambda}_{\mu \nu }\frac{{\rm d}x^\mu }{{\rm d}t}\frac{{\rm d}x^\nu }{{\rm d}t} = 0\ ,$$ where Γ is a Christoffel symbol of the second kind, containing the metric.
GEM Equations If g the gravitational field and H the gravitomagnetic field, the solutions in these limits are: $$\nabla \cdot \mathbf{g} = -4 \pi G \rho \,\!$$ $$\nabla \cdot \mathbf{H} = \mathbf{0} \,\!$$ $$\nabla \times \mathbf{g} = -\frac{\partial \mathbf{H}} {\partial t} \,\!$$ $$\nabla \times \mathbf{H} =  \frac{4}{c^2}\left( - 4 \pi G\mathbf{J} + \frac{\partial \mathbf{g}} {\partial t} \right) \,\!$$ where ρ is the mass density and J is the mass current density or mass flux.
In addition there is the gravitomagnetic Lorentz force: $$\mathbf{F} = \gamma(\mathbf{v}) m \left( \mathbf{g} + \mathbf{v} \times \mathbf{H} \right)$$ where m is the rest mass of the particlce and γ is the Lorentz factor.

==== Classical laws ====
Kepler's laws, though originally discovered from planetary observations (also due to Tycho Brahe), are true for any central forces.

Newton's law of universal gravitation: For two point masses: $$\mathbf{F} = \frac{G m_1 m_2}{\left | \mathbf{r} \right |^2} \mathbf{\hat{r}} \,\!$$ For a nonuniform mass distribution of local mass density ρ(r) of body of volume V, this becomes: $$\mathbf{g} = G \int_V \frac{\mathbf{r} \rho  \, \mathrm{d}{V}}{\left | \mathbf{r} \right |^3}\,\!$$	Gauss's law for gravity: An equivalent statement to Newton's law is: $$\nabla\cdot\mathbf{g} = 4\pi G\rho \,\!$$
Kepler's 1st law: Planets move in an ellipse, with the star at a focus $$r = \frac\ell{1+e \cos\theta}  \,\!$$ where $$e = \sqrt{1- (b/a)^2}$$ is the eccentricity of the elliptic orbit, of semi-major axis a and semi-minor axis b, and ℓ is the semi-latus rectum. This equation in itself is nothing physically fundamental; simply the polar equation of an ellipse in which the pole (origin of polar coordinate system) is positioned at a focus of the ellipse, where the orbited star is.
Kepler's 2nd law: equal areas are swept out in equal times (area bounded by two radial distances and the orbital circumference): $$\frac{\mathrm{d}A}{\mathrm{d}t} = \frac{\left | \mathbf{L} \right |}{2m} \,\!$$ where L is the orbital angular momentum of the particle (i.e. planet) of mass m about the focus of orbit,
Kepler's 3rd law: The square of the orbital time period T is proportional to the cube of the semi-major axis a: $$T^2 =  \frac{4\pi^2}{G \left ( m + M \right ) } a^3\,\!$$ where M is the mass of the central body (i.e. star).

=== Thermodynamics ===
Laws of thermodynamics
First law of thermodynamics: The change in internal energy dU in a closed system is accounted for entirely by the heat δQ absorbed by the system and the work δW done by the system: $$\mathrm{d}U=\delta Q-\delta W\,$$ Second law of thermodynamics: There are many statements of this law, perhaps the simplest is "the entropy of isolated systems never decreases", $$\Delta S \ge 0$$ meaning reversible changes have zero entropy change, irreversible process are positive, and impossible process are negative.	Zeroth law of thermodynamics: If two systems are in thermal equilibrium with a third system, then they are in thermal equilibrium with one another. $$T_A = T_B \,, T_B=T_C \Rightarrow T_A=T_C\,\!$$ Third law of thermodynamics: As the temperature T of a system approaches absolute zero, the entropy S approaches a minimum value C: as T → 0, S → C.
For homogeneous systems the first and second law can be combined into the Fundamental thermodynamic relation: $$\mathrm{d} U = T \, \mathrm{d} S - P \, \mathrm{d} V + \sum_i \mu_i \, \mathrm{d}N_i \,\!$$	Zeroth law of thermodynamics: If two systems are in thermal equilibrium with a third system, then they are in thermal equilibrium with one another. $$T_A = T_B \,, T_B=T_C \Rightarrow T_A=T_C\,\!$$ Third law of thermodynamics: As the temperature T of a system approaches absolute zero, the entropy S approaches a minimum value C: as T → 0, S → C.
Onsager reciprocal relations: sometimes called the fourth law of thermodynamics $$\mathbf{J}_\text{u} = L_\text{uu}\, \nabla(1/T) - L_\text{ur}\, \nabla(m/T);$$ $$\mathbf{J}_\text{r} = L_\text{ru}\, \nabla(1/T) - L_\text{rr}\, \nabla(m/T).$$

- Newton's law of cooling
- Fourier's law
- Ideal gas law, combines a number of separately developed gas laws;
  - Boyle's law
  - Charles's law
  - Gay-Lussac's law
  - Avogadro's law, into one

now improved by other equations of state

- Dalton's law (of partial pressures)
- Boltzmann equation
- Carnot's theorem
- Kopp's law

=== Electromagnetism ===
Maxwell's equations give the time-evolution of the electric and magnetic fields due to electric charge and current distributions. Given the fields, the Lorentz force law is the equation of motion for charges in the fields.

Maxwell's equations Gauss's law for electricity $$\nabla \cdot \mathbf{E} = \frac{\rho}{\varepsilon_0}$$ Gauss's law for magnetism $$\nabla \cdot \mathbf{B} = 0$$ Faraday's law $$\nabla \times \mathbf{E} = -\frac{\partial \mathbf{B}} {\partial t}$$ Ampère's circuital law (with Maxwell's correction) $$\nabla \times \mathbf{B} = \mu_0 \mathbf{J} + \frac{1}{c^2}  \frac{\partial \mathbf{E}}{\partial t} \$$	Lorentz force law: $$\mathbf{F}=q\left(\mathbf{E}+\mathbf{v}\times\mathbf{B}\right)$$
Quantum electrodynamics (QED): Maxwell's equations are generally true and consistent with relativity – but they do not predict some observed quantum phenomena (e.g. light propagation as EM waves, rather than photons, see Maxwell's equations for details). They are modified in QED theory.

These equations can be modified to include magnetic monopoles, and are consistent with our observations of monopoles either existing or not existing; if they do not exist, the generalized equations reduce to the ones above, if they do, the equations become fully symmetric in electric and magnetic charges and currents. Indeed, there is a duality transformation where electric and magnetic charges can be "rotated into one another", and still satisfy Maxwell's equations.

Pre-Maxwell laws:

These laws were found before the formulation of Maxwell's equations. They are not fundamental, since they can be derived from Maxwell's equations. Coulomb's law can be found from Gauss's law (electrostatic form) and the Biot–Savart law can be deduced from Ampere's law (magnetostatic form). Lenz's law and Faraday's law can be incorporated into the Maxwell–Faraday equation. Nonetheless, they are still very effective for simple calculations.

- Lenz's law
- Coulomb's law
- Biot–Savart law

Other laws:

- Ohm's law
- Kirchhoff's laws
- Joule's law

=== Photonics ===
Classically, optics is based on a variational principle: light travels from one point in space to another in the shortest time.

- Fermat's principle

In geometric optics laws are based on approximations in Euclidean geometry (such as the paraxial approximation).

- Law of reflection
- Law of refraction, Snell's law

In physical optics, laws are based on physical properties of materials.

- Brewster's angle
- Malus's law
- Beer–Lambert law

In actuality, optical properties of matter are significantly more complex and require quantum mechanics.

=== Laws of quantum mechanics ===
Quantum mechanics has its roots in postulates. This leads to results which are not usually called "laws", but hold the same status, in that all of quantum mechanics follows from them. These postulates can be summarized as follows:

- The state of a physical system, be it a particle or a system of many particles, is described by a wavefunction.
- Every physical quantity is described by an operator acting on the system; the measured quantity has a probabilistic nature.
- The wavefunction obeys the Schrödinger equation. Solving this wave equation predicts the time-evolution of the system's behavior, analogous to solving Newton's laws in classical mechanics.
- Two identical particles, such as two electrons, cannot be distinguished from one another by any means. Physical systems are classified by their symmetry properties.

These postulates in turn imply many other phenomena, e.g., uncertainty principles and the Pauli exclusion principle.

Quantum mechanics, Quantum field theory Schrödinger equation (general form): Describes the time dependence of a quantum mechanical system. $$i\hbar \frac{d}{dt} \left| \psi \right\rangle = \hat{H} \left| \psi \right\rangle$$ The Hamiltonian (in quantum mechanics) H is a self-adjoint operator acting on the state space, $| \psi \rangle$ (see Dirac notation) is the instantaneous quantum state vector at time t, position r, i is the unit imaginary number, ħ = h/2π is the reduced Planck constant.	Wave–particle duality Planck–Einstein law: the energy of photons is proportional to the frequency of the light (the constant is the Planck constant, h). $$E = h\nu = \hbar \omega$$ De Broglie wavelength: this laid the foundations of wave–particle duality, and was the key concept in the Schrödinger equation, $$\mathbf{p} = \frac{h}{\lambda}\mathbf{\hat{k}} = \hbar \mathbf{k}$$ Heisenberg uncertainty principle: Uncertainty in position multiplied by uncertainty in momentum is at least half of the reduced Planck constant, similarly for time and energy; $$\Delta x \, \Delta p \ge \frac{\hbar}{2},\, \Delta E \, \Delta t \ge \frac{\hbar}{2}$$ The uncertainty principle can be generalized to any pair of observables – see main article.
Wave mechanics Schrödinger equation (original form): $$i\hbar \frac{\partial}{\partial t}\psi = -\frac{\hbar^2}{2m} \nabla^2 \psi + V \psi$$
Pauli exclusion principle: No two identical fermions can occupy the same quantum state (bosons can). Mathematically, if two particles are interchanged, fermionic wavefunctions are anti-symmetric, while bosonic wavefunctions are symmetric: $$\psi(\cdots\mathbf{r}_i\cdots\mathbf{r}_j\cdots) = (-1)^{2s}\psi(\cdots\mathbf{r}_j\cdots\mathbf{r}_i\cdots)$$ where r_{i} is the position of particle i, and s is the spin of the particle. There is no way to keep track of particles physically, labels are only used mathematically to prevent confusion.

=== Radiation laws ===
Applying electromagnetism, thermodynamics, and quantum mechanics, to atoms and molecules, some laws of electromagnetic radiation and light are as follows.

- Stefan–Boltzmann law
- Planck's law of black-body radiation
- Wien's displacement law
- Radioactive decay law

== Laws of chemistry ==
Chemical laws are those laws of nature relevant to chemistry. Historically, observations led to many empirical laws, though now it is known that chemistry has its foundations in quantum mechanics.

Quantitative analysis:

The most fundamental concept in chemistry is the law of conservation of mass, which states that there is no detectable change in the quantity of matter during an ordinary chemical reaction. Modern physics shows that it is actually energy that is conserved, and that energy and mass are related; a concept which becomes important in nuclear chemistry. Conservation of energy leads to the important concepts of equilibrium, thermodynamics, and kinetics.

Additional laws of chemistry elaborate on the law of conservation of mass. Joseph Proust's law of definite composition says that pure chemicals are composed of elements in a definite formulation; we now know that the structural arrangement of these elements is also important.

Dalton's law of multiple proportions says that these chemicals will present themselves in proportions that are small whole numbers; although in many systems (notably biomacromolecules and minerals) the ratios tend to require large numbers, and are frequently represented as a fraction.

The law of definite composition and the law of multiple proportions are the first two of the three laws of stoichiometry, the proportions by which the chemical elements combine to form chemical compounds. The third law of stoichiometry is the law of reciprocal proportions, which provides the basis for establishing equivalent weights for each chemical element. Elemental equivalent weights can then be used to derive atomic weights for each element.

More modern laws of chemistry define the relationship between energy and its transformations.

Reaction kinetics and equilibria:

- In equilibrium, molecules exist in mixture defined by the transformations possible on the timescale of the equilibrium, and are in a ratio defined by the intrinsic energy of the molecules—the lower the intrinsic energy, the more abundant the molecule. Le Chatelier's principle states that the system opposes changes in conditions from equilibrium states, i.e. there is an opposition to change the state of an equilibrium reaction.
- Transforming one structure to another requires the input of energy to cross an energy barrier; this can come from the intrinsic energy of the molecules themselves, or from an external source which will generally accelerate transformations. The higher the energy barrier, the slower the transformation occurs.
- There is a hypothetical intermediate, or transition structure, that corresponds to the structure at the top of the energy barrier. The Hammond–Leffler postulate states that this structure looks most similar to the product or starting material which has intrinsic energy closest to that of the energy barrier. Stabilizing this hypothetical intermediate through chemical interaction is one way to achieve catalysis.
- All chemical processes are reversible (law of microscopic reversibility) although some processes have such an energy bias, they are essentially irreversible.
- The reaction rate has the mathematical parameter known as the rate constant. The Arrhenius equation gives the temperature and activation energy dependence of the rate constant, an empirical law.

Thermochemistry:

- Dulong–Petit law
- Gibbs–Helmholtz equation
- Hess's law

Gas laws:

- Raoult's law
- Henry's law

Chemical transport:

- Fick's laws of diffusion
- Graham's law
- Lamm equation

== Laws of biology ==
=== Ecology ===
- Competitive exclusion principle or Gause's law

=== Genetics ===
- Mendelian laws (Dominance and Uniformity, segregation of genes, and Independent Assortment)
- Hardy–Weinberg principle

=== Natural selection ===
Whether or not Natural Selection is a "law of nature" is controversial among biologists. Henry Byerly, an American philosopher known for his work on evolutionary theory, discussed the problem of interpreting a principle of natural selection as a law. He suggested a formulation of natural selection as a framework principle that can contribute to a better understanding of evolutionary theory. His approach was to express relative fitness, the propensity of a genotype to increase in proportionate representation in a competitive environment, as a function of adaptedness (adaptive design) of the organism.

== Laws of Earth sciences ==
=== Geography ===
- Arbia's law of geography
- Tobler's first law of geography
- Tobler's second law of geography

=== Geology ===
- Archie's law
- Buys Ballot's law
- Birch's law
- Byerlee's law
- Principle of original horizontality
- Law of superposition
- Principle of lateral continuity
- Principle of cross-cutting relationships
- Principle of faunal succession
- Principle of inclusions and components
- Walther's law

== Other fields ==
Some mathematical theorems and axioms are referred to as laws because they provide logical foundation to empirical laws.

Examples of other observed phenomena sometimes described as laws include the Titius–Bode law of planetary positions, Zipf's law of linguistics, and Moore's law of technological growth. Many of these laws fall within the scope of uncomfortable science. Other laws are pragmatic and observational, such as the law of unintended consequences. By analogy, principles in other fields of study are sometimes loosely referred to as "laws". These include Occam's razor as a principle of philosophy and the Pareto principle of economics.

== History ==
The observation and detection of underlying regularities in nature date from prehistoric times – the recognition of cause-and-effect relationships implicitly recognises the existence of laws of nature. The recognition of such regularities as independent scientific laws per se, though, was limited by their entanglement in animism, and by the attribution of many effects that do not have readily obvious causes—such as physical phenomena—to the actions of gods, spirits, supernatural beings, etc. Observation and speculation about nature were intimately bound up with metaphysics and morality.

In Europe, systematic theorizing about nature (physis) began with the early Greek philosophers and scientists and continued into the Hellenistic and Roman imperial periods, during which times the intellectual influence of Roman law increasingly became paramount.

The formula "law of nature" first appears as "a live metaphor" favored by Latin poets Lucretius, Virgil, Ovid, Manilius, in time gaining a firm theoretical presence in the prose treatises of Seneca and Pliny. Why this Roman origin? According to [historian and classicist Daryn] Lehoux's persuasive narrative, the idea was made possible by the pivotal role of codified law and forensic argument in Roman life and culture.

For the Romans ... the place par excellence where ethics, law, nature, religion and politics overlap is the law court. When we read Seneca's Natural Questions, and watch again and again just how he applies standards of evidence, witness evaluation, argument and proof, we can recognize that we are reading one of the great Roman rhetoricians of the age, thoroughly immersed in forensic method. And not Seneca alone. Legal models of scientific judgment turn up all over the place, and for example prove equally integral to Ptolemy's approach to verification, where the mind is assigned the role of magistrate, the senses that of disclosure of evidence, and dialectical reason that of the law itself.

The precise formulation of what are now recognized as modern and valid statements of the laws of nature dates from the 17th century in Europe, with the beginning of accurate experimentation and the development of advanced forms of mathematics. During this period, natural philosophers such as Isaac Newton (1642–1727) were influenced by a religious view – stemming from medieval concepts of divine law – which held that God had instituted absolute, universal and immutable physical laws. In chapter 7 of The World, René Descartes (1596–1650) described "nature" as matter itself, unchanging as created by God, thus changes in parts "are to be attributed to nature. The rules according to which these changes take place I call the 'laws of nature'." The modern scientific method which took shape at this time (with Francis Bacon (1561–1626) and Galileo (1564–1642)) contributed to a trend of separating science from theology, with minimal speculation about metaphysics and ethics. (Natural law in the political sense, conceived as universal (i.e., divorced from sectarian religion and accidents of place), was also elaborated in this period by scholars such as Grotius (1583–1645), Spinoza (1632–1677), and Hobbes (1588–1679).)

The distinction between natural law in the political-legal sense and law of nature or physical law in the scientific sense is a modern one, both concepts being equally derived from physis, the Greek word (translated into Latin as natura) for nature.

== See also ==
- Empirical research
- Empirical statistical laws
- Formula
- List of laws
- Law (principle)
- Nomology
- Philosophy of science
- Physical constant
- List of scientific laws named after people
- Theory
