= Law of reciprocal proportions =

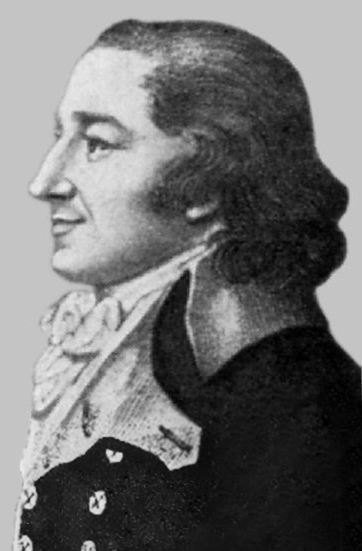
Jeremias Benjamin Richter

The law of reciprocal proportions, also called law of equivalent proportions or law of permanent ratios, is one of the basic laws of stoichiometry.

It relates the proportions in which elements combine across a number of different elements. It was first formulated by Jeremias Richter in 1791. A simple statement of the law is:

If element A combines with element B and also with C, then, if B and C combine together, the proportion by weight in which they do so will be simply related to the weights of B and C which separately combine with a constant weight of A.

As an example, 1 gram of sodium (Na = A) is observed to combine with either 1.54 grams of chlorine (Cl = B) or 5.52 grams of iodine (I = C). (These ratios correspond to the modern formulas NaCl and NaI). The ratio of these two weights is 5.52/1.54 = 3.58. It is also observed that 1 gram of chlorine reacts with 1.19 g of iodine. This ratio of 1.19 obeys the law because it is a simple fraction (1/3) of 3.58. (This is because it corresponds to the formula ICl_{3}, which is one known compound of iodine and chlorine.) Similarly, hydrogen, carbon, and oxygen follow the law of reciprocal proportions.

The acceptance of the law allowed tables of element equivalent weights to be drawn up. These equivalent weights were widely used by chemists in the 19th century.

The other laws of stoichiometry are the law of definite proportions and the law of multiple proportions. The law of definite proportions refers to the fixed composition of any compound formed between element A and element B. The law of multiple proportions describes the stoichiometric relationship between two or more different compounds formed between element A and element B. The law states that if two different elements combine separately with a fixed mass of a third element, the ratio of the masses in which they combine are either the same or are in simple multiple ratio of the masses in which they combine with each other.

== History ==
The law of reciprocal proportions was proposed in essence by Richter, following his determination of neutralisation ratios of metals with acids. In the early 19th century it was investigated by Berzelius, who formulated it as follows:

When two substances, A and B have an affinity for two others, C and D, the ratio of the quantities C and D which saturate the same amount of A is the same as that between the quantities C and D which saturate the same amount of B.

Later Jean Stas showed that within experimental error the stoichiometric laws were correct.
