= Jeremias Benjamin Richter =

German chemist (1762–1807)

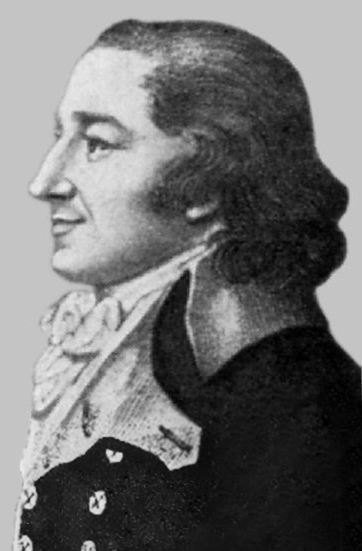
- Born: 10 March 1762; Hirschberg, Prussia (present-day Poland)
- Died: 4 May 1807 (aged 45); Berlin (present-day Germany)
- Known for: Law of reciprocal proportions Stoichiometry

Jeremias Benjamin Richter (German: [ˈʁɪçtɐ]; 10 March 1762 – 4 May 1807) was a German chemist. He was born at Hirschberg in Silesia, became a mining official at Breslau in 1794, and by 1800 was appointed assessor to the department of mines and chemist to the royal porcelain factory at Berlin, where he died. He is known for introducing the term stoichiometry.

== Developer of titration ==
He made some of the earliest known determinations of the quantities by weight in which acids saturate bases and bases acids. He realised that those amounts of different bases which can saturate the same quantity of a particular acid are equivalent to each other (see Titration).

He was thus led to conclude that chemistry is a branch of applied mathematics and to endeavour to trace a law according to which the quantities of different bases required to saturate a given acid formed an arithmetical progression, and the quantities of acids saturating a given base a geometric progression.

== Law of definite proportions (stoichiometry) ==
Richter found that the ratio by weight of the compounds consumed in a chemical reaction was always the same. It took 615 parts by weight of magnesia (MgO), for example, to neutralize 1000 parts by weight of sulfuric acid. From his data, Ernst Gottfried Fischer calculated in 1802 the first table of chemical equivalents, taking sulphuric acid as the standard with a value of 1000. When Joseph Proust reported his work on the constant composition of chemical compounds, the time was ripe for the reinvention of an atomic theory. The law of definite proportions and constant composition alone do not prove that atoms exist, but their existence is difficult to explain without assuming that chemical compounds are formed when atoms combine in constant proportions.

== Publications ==
His findings were published in Über die neueren Gegenstände in der Chemie (1792–1802) and Anfangsgründe der Stöchiometrie or Messkunst chemischer Elemente (1792–1794), but a considerable period of time elapsed before they were fully acknowledged. This was partly because some of his work was incorrectly ascribed to Carl Wenzel by Jons Berzelius which was only corrected in 1841 by Henri Hess, professor of chemistry at St. Petersburg, and author of the laws of constant heat-sums and of thermoneutrality.

== Later work ==
Between 1792 and 1794 he published a three-volume summary of his work on the law of definite proportions. In this book Richter introduced the term stoichiometry, which he defined as the art of chemical measurements, which has to deal with the laws according to which substances unite to form chemical compounds.

Richter was fascinated with the role of mathematics in chemistry. Unfortunately, his writing style has been described as obscure and clumsy. His work therefore had little impact until 1802, when it was summarized by Ernst Gottfried Fischer in terms of tables.

== See also ==
- Equivalent weight
