= Sai Life Sciences =

Indian contract research, development, and manufacturing organisation

Sai Life Sciences Limited
- Traded as: NSE: SAILIFE; BSE: 544306
- Industry: Pharmaceutical services
- Founded: 1999
- Founder: Krishna Kanumuri
- Headquarters: Hyderabad, Telangana, India
- Key people: Krishna Kanumuri (Executive Chairman)
- Website: sailife.com

Sai Life Sciences Limited is an Indian contract research, development, and manufacturing organisation, headquartered in Hyderabad, Telangana. The company provides drug discovery, development, contract manufacturing services for small-molecule new chemical entities to pharmaceutical and biotechnology companies.

The company was established in Hyderabad in January 1999 as Sai Dru Syn Laboratories Limited. It was later renamed Sai Life Sciences Limited. It operates R&D and manufacturing facilities in India, the UK, and the USA.
