= Ernst Gottfried Fischer =

German chemist (1754–1831)

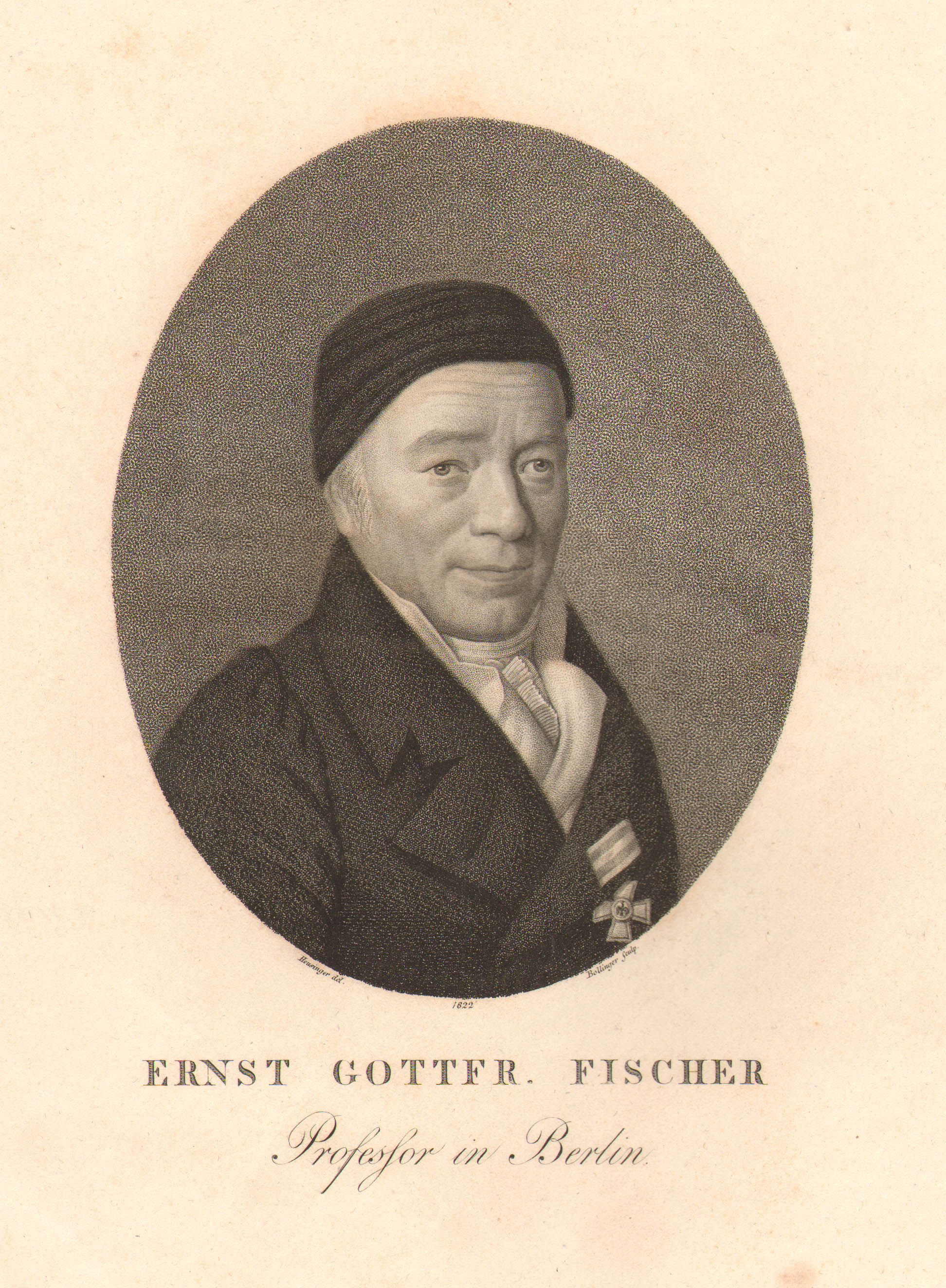
- Born: 17 July 1754; Hoheneiche (near Saalfeld
- Died: 27 January 1831 (aged 76)
- Education: University of Halle
- Known for: Proposing a system of equivalents
- Scientific career
- Fields: Inorganic chemistry

Ernst Gottfried Fischer (17 July 1754 – 27 January 1831) was a German chemist. He was born in Hoheneiche near Saalfeld. After studying theology and mathematics at the University of Halle, he was a teacher in Berlin before becoming Professor of Physics in 1810. He translated Claude Berthollet's publication Recherches sur les lois de l'affinitié in 1802. He proposed a system of equivalents based on sulfuric acid equal to 1000.

== Stoichiometry contribution ==
Jeremias Benjamin Richter's work had little impact until 1802, when it was summarized by Fischer in terms of tables, such as the one below.

According to this table, it takes 615 parts by weight of magnesia to neutralize either 1000 parts by weight of sulfuric acid or 1405 parts by weight of nitric acid. In the early literature on the subject, these weights were referred to as combining weights.

Weights of acids and bases that are chemically equivalent
Bases		Acids
Name	Parts required to titrate	Name	Parts required to titrate
Alumina (aluminium oxide)	525	Carbonic acid	577
Magnesia	615	Muriatic acid (hydrochloric acid)	712
Lime (calcium carbonate)	793	Phosphoric acid	979
Calcium hydroxide	793	Oxalic acid	755
Soda (sodium carbonate)	859	Sulfuric acid	1000
Potash (potassium carbonate)	1605	Aqua fortis (nitric acid)	1405
Barite (barium sulfate)	2222	Acetic acid	1480

== Works ==
- La Fisica Meccanica (in Italian). Milano: Giovanni Bernardoni. 1823.
