= Equivalent weight =

Mass of one equivalent

In chemistry, equivalent weight (more precisely, equivalent mass) is the mass of one equivalent, that is the mass of a given substance which will combine with or displace a fixed quantity of another substance.

The equivalent weight of an element is the mass which combines with or displaces 1.008 grams of hydrogen or 8.0 grams of oxygen or 35.5 grams of chlorine. The corresponding unit of measurement is sometimes expressed as "gram equivalent". The equivalent weight of an element is also the mass of a mole of the element divided by the element's valence. That is, in grams, the atomic weight of the element divided by the usual valence. For example, the equivalent weight of oxygen is 16.0/2 = 8.0 grams.

For acid–base reactions, the equivalent weight of an acid or base is the mass which supplies or reacts with one mole of hydrogen cations (H^{+}). For redox reactions, the equivalent weight of each reactant supplies or reacts with one mole of electrons (e^{−}) in a redox reaction.

Equivalent weight has the units of mass, unlike atomic weight, which is now used as a synonym for relative atomic mass and is dimensionless. Equivalent weights were originally determined by experiment, but (insofar as they are still used) are now derived from molar masses. The equivalent weight of a compound can also be calculated by dividing the molecular mass by the number of positive or negative electrical charges that result from the dissolution of the compound.

== In history ==
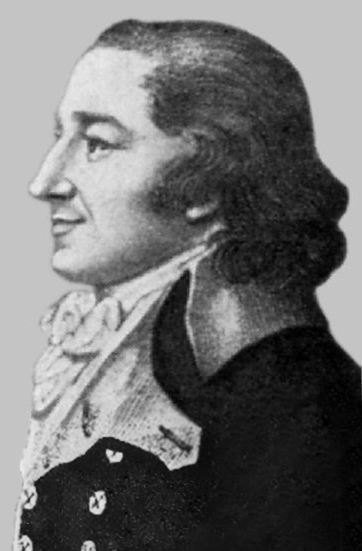
Jeremias Benjamin Richter (1762–1807), one of the first chemists to publish tables of equivalent weights, and also the coiner of the word "stoichiometry".

The first equivalent weights were published for acids and bases by Carl Friedrich Wenzel in 1777. A larger set of tables was prepared, possibly independently, by Jeremias Benjamin Richter, starting in 1792. However, neither Wenzel nor Richter had a single reference point for their tables, and so had to publish separate tables for each pair of acid and base.

John Dalton's first table of atomic weights (1808) suggested a reference point, at least for the elements: taking the equivalent weight of hydrogen to be one unit of mass. However, Dalton's atomic theory was far from universally accepted in the early 19th century. One of the greatest problems was the reaction of hydrogen with oxygen to produce water. One gram of hydrogen reacts with eight grams of oxygen to produce nine grams of water, so the equivalent weight of oxygen was defined as eight grams. Since Dalton supposed (incorrectly) that a water molecule consisted of one hydrogen and one oxygen atom, this would imply an atomic weight of oxygen equal to eight. However, expressing the reaction in terms of gas volumes following Gay-Lussac's law of combining gas volumes, two volumes of hydrogen react with one volume of oxygen to produce two volumes of water, suggesting (correctly) that the atomic weight of oxygen is sixteen. The work of Charles Frédéric Gerhardt (1816–56), Henri Victor Regnault (1810–78) and Stanislao Cannizzaro (1826–1910) helped to rationalise this and many similar paradoxes, but the problem was still the subject of debate at the Karlsruhe Congress (1860).

Many chemists found equivalent weights to be a useful tool even if they did not subscribe to the physics based atomic theory. Equivalent weights were a useful generalisation of Joseph Proust's law of definite proportions (1794) which enabled chemistry to become a quantitative science. French chemist Jean-Baptiste Dumas (1800–84) became one of the more influential opponents of atomic theory, after having embraced it earlier in his career, but was a staunch supporter of equivalent weights.

Insofar as the atomic tables have been drawn up in part following the laws of Wenzel and Richter, in part by simple speculations, they have left plenty of doubts in the best of minds. It was to escape this problem that it was attempted to deduce the atomic weights from the density of the elements in the vapour state, from their specific heat, from their crystalline form. But one must not forget that the value of the figures deduced from these properties is not in the least absolute… To sum up, what have left from this ambitious excursion that we have allowed ourselves in the realm of the atoms? Nothing, nothing necessary at the very least. What we have left is the conviction that chemistry got itself lost there, as it always does when it abandons experiment, it tried to walk without a guide through the shadows. With experiment as a guide, you find Wenzel's equivalents, Mitscherlich's equivalents, they are nothing else but molecular groups. If I had the power, I would erase the word 'atom' from science, persuaded that it oversteps the evidence of experiment; and, in chemistry, we must never overstep the evidence of experiment.

— Jean-Baptiste Dumas, lecture at the Collège de France, 1843/44

Equivalent weights were not without problems of their own. For a start, the scale based on hydrogen was not particularly practical, as most elements do not react directly with hydrogen to form simple compounds. However, one gram of hydrogen reacts with 8 grams of oxygen to give water or with 35.5 grams of chlorine to give hydrogen chloride. Hence 8 grams of oxygen and 35.5 grams of chlorine can be taken to be equivalent to one gram of hydrogen for the measurement of equivalent weights. This system can be extended further through different acids and bases.

Much more serious was the problem of elements which form more than one oxide or series of salts, which have (in today's terminology) different oxidation states. Copper will react with oxygen to form either brick red cuprous oxide (copper(I) oxide, with 63.5 g of copper for 8 g of oxygen) or black cupric oxide (copper(II) oxide, with 32.7 g of copper for 8 g of oxygen), and so has two equivalent weights. Supporters of atomic weights could turn to the Dulong–Petit law (1819), which relates the atomic weight of a solid element to its specific heat capacity, to arrive at a unique and unambiguous set of atomic weights. Most supporters of equivalent weights - which included the great majority of chemists prior to 1860 — simply ignored the inconvenient fact that most elements exhibited multiple equivalent weights. Instead, these chemists had settled on a list of what were universally called "equivalents" (H = 1, O = 8, C = 6, S = 16, Cl = 35.5, Na = 23, Ca = 20, and so on). However, these nineteenth-century "equivalents" were not equivalents in the original or modern sense of the term. Since they represented dimensionless numbers that for any given element were unique and unchanging, they were in fact simply an alternative set of atomic weights, in which the elements of even valence have atomic weights one-half of the modern values. This fact was not recognized until much later.

The final death blow for the use of equivalent weights for the elements was Dmitri Mendeleev's presentation of his periodic table in 1869, in which he related the chemical properties of the elements to the approximate order of their atomic weights. However, equivalent weights continued to be used for many compounds for another hundred years, particularly in analytical chemistry. Equivalent weights of common reagents could be tabulated, simplifying analytical calculations in the days before the widespread availability of electronic calculators. Such tables were commonplace in textbooks of analytical chemistry.

== Use in general chemistry ==
The use of equivalent weights in general chemistry has largely been superseded by the use of molar masses. Equivalent weights may be calculated from molar masses if the chemistry of the substance is well known:

- sulfuric acid has a molar mass of 98.078(5) g mol^{−1}, and supplies two moles of hydrogen ions per mole of sulfuric acid, so its equivalent weight is 98.078(5) g mol^{−1}/2 eq mol^{−1} = 49.039(3) g eq^{−1}.
- potassium permanganate has a molar mass of 158.034(1) g mol^{−1}, and reacts with five moles of electrons per mole of potassium permanganate, so its equivalent weight is 158.034(1) g mol^{−1}/5 eq mol^{−1} = 31.6068(3) g eq^{−1}.

Historically, the equivalent weights of the elements were often determined by studying their reactions with oxygen. For example, 50 g of zinc will react with oxygen to produce 62.24 g of zinc oxide, implying that the zinc has reacted with 12.24 g of oxygen (from the Law of conservation of mass). The equivalent weight of zinc is the mass which will react with eight grams of oxygen, hence 50 g × 8 g/12.24 g = 32.7 g.

Some contemporary general chemistry textbooks make no mention of equivalent weights. Others explain the topic, but point out that it is merely an alternate method of doing calculations using moles.

== Use in volumetric analysis ==
Burette over a conical flask with phenolphthalein indicator used for acid–base titration

When choosing primary standards in analytical chemistry, compounds with higher equivalent weights are generally more desirable because weighing errors are reduced. An example is the volumetric standardisation of a solution of sodium hydroxide which has been prepared to approximately 0.1 mol dm^{−3}. It is necessary to calculate the mass of a solid acid which will react with about 20 cm^{3} of this solution (for a titration using a 25 cm^{3} burette). Suitable solid acids include oxalic acid dihydrate, potassium hydrogen phthalate and potassium hydrogen iodate. The equivalent weights of the three acids 63.04 g, 204.23 g and 389.92 g respectively, and the masses required for the standardisation are 126.1 mg, 408.5 mg and 779.8 mg respectively. Given that the measurement uncertainty in the mass measured on a standard analytical balance is ±0.1 mg, the relative uncertainty in the mass of oxalic acid dihydrate would be about one part in a thousand, similar to the measurement uncertainty in the volume measurement in the titration. However the measurement uncertainty in the mass of potassium hydrogen iodate would be five times lower, because its equivalent weight is five times higher. Such an uncertainty in the measured mass is negligible in comparison to the uncertainty in the volume measured during the titration (see example below).

As an example, assume that 22.45±0.03 cm^{3} of the sodium hydroxide solution reacts with 781.4±0.1 mg of potassium hydrogen iodate. As the equivalent weight of potassium hydrogen iodate is 389.92 g, the measured mass is 2.004 milliequivalents. The concentration of the sodium hydroxide solution is therefore 2.004 meq/0.02245 L = 89.3 meq/L. In analytical chemistry, a solution of any substance which contains one equivalent per litre is known as a normal solution (abbreviated N), so the example sodium hydroxide solution would be 0.0893 N. The relative uncertainty (u_{r}) in the measured concentration can be estimated by assuming a Gaussian distribution of the measurement uncertainties:

$$\begin{align}
u_{\rm r}^2 &= \left(\frac{u(V)}{V}\right)^2 + \left(\frac{u(m)}{m}\right)^2 \\
&= \left(\frac{0.03}{22.45}\right)^2 + \left(\frac{0.1}{781.4}\right)^2 \\
&= (0.001336)^2 + (0.000128)^2\\
u_{\rm r} &= 0.00134 \\
u(c) &= u_{\rm r}c = 0.1\ {\rm meq/L}
\end{align}$$

This sodium hydroxide solution can be used to measure the equivalent weight of an unknown acid. For example, if it takes 13.20±0.03 cm^{3} of the sodium hydroxide solution to neutralise 61.3±0.1 mg of an unknown acid, the equivalent weight of the acid is:

$$\text{equivalent weight} = \frac{m_\ce{acid}}{c(\ce{NaOH})V_\ce{eq}} = 52.0\pm 0.1\ \ce{g}$$

Because each mole of acid can only release an integer number of moles of hydrogen ions, the molar mass of the unknown acid must be an integer multiple of 52.0±0.1 g.

== Use in gravimetric analysis ==
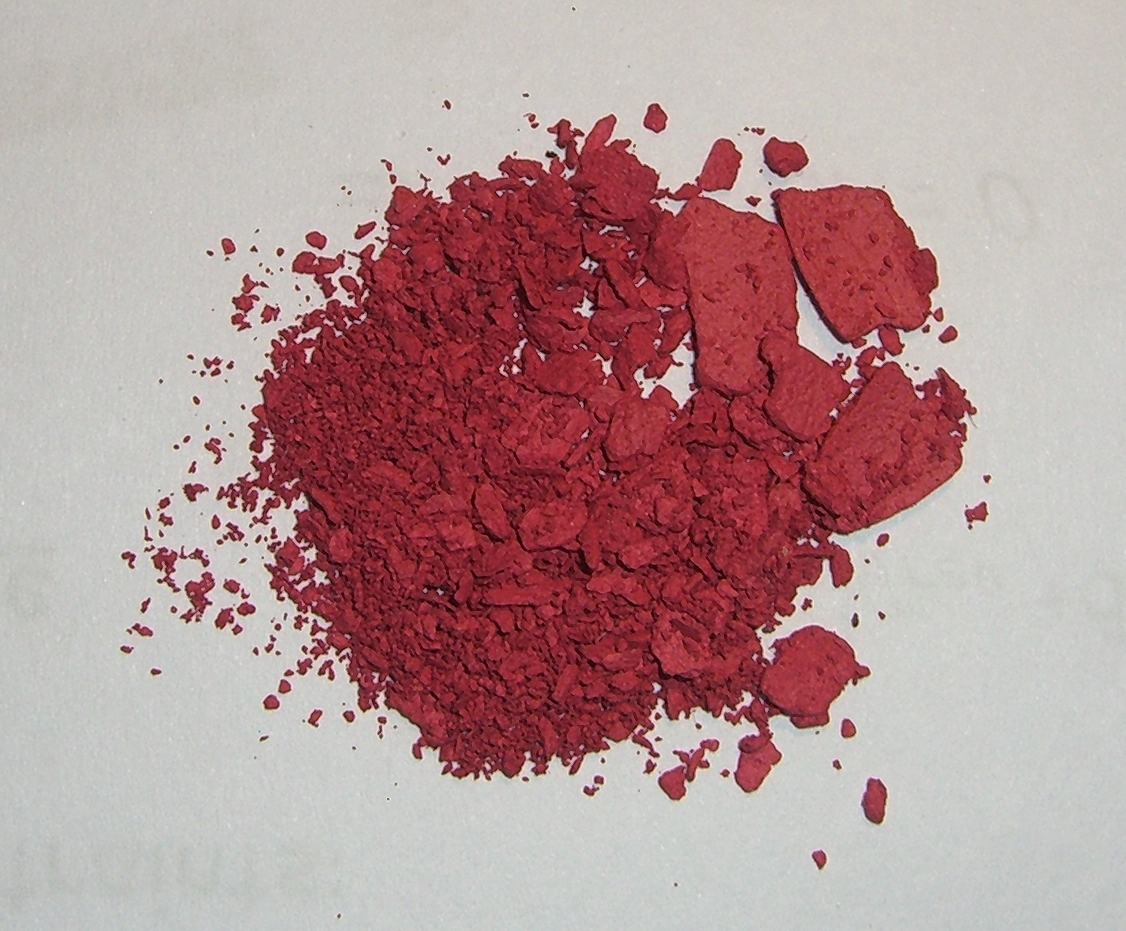
Powdered bis(dimethylglyoximate)nickel. This coordination compound can be used for the gravimetric determination of nickel.

The term “equivalent weight” had a distinct meaning in gravimetric analysis: it meant the mass of precipitate produced from one gram of analyte (the species of interest). The different definitions came from the practice of quoting gravimetric results as mass fractions of the analyte, often expressed as a percentage. A related term was the equivalence factor, one gram divided by equivalent weight, which was the numerical factor by which the mass of precipitate had to be multiplied to obtain the mass of analyte.

For example, in the gravimetric determination of nickel, the molar mass of the precipitate bis(dimethylglyoximate)nickel [Ni(dmgH)_{2}] is 288.915(7) g mol^{−1}, while the molar mass of nickel is 58.6934(2) g mol^{−1}. Hence 288.915(7)/58.6934(2) = 4.9224(1) grams of [Ni(dmgH)_{2}] precipitate is equivalent to one gram of nickel and the equivalence factor is 0.203151(5). For example, 215.3±0.1 mg of [Ni(dmgH)_{2}] precipitate is equivalent to (215.3±0.1 mg) × 0.203151(5) = 43.74±0.2 mg of nickel. If the original sample size was 5.346±0.001 g, the nickel content in the original sample would be 0.8182±0.0004%.

Gravimetric analysis is one of the most precise of the common methods of chemical analysis, but it is time-consuming and labour-intensive. It has been largely superseded by other techniques such as atomic absorption spectroscopy, in which the mass of analyte is read off from a calibration curve.

== Use in polymer chemistry ==
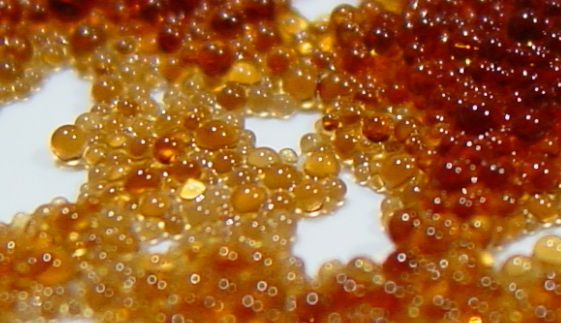
Beads of an ion-exchange polymer.

In polymer chemistry, the equivalent weight of a reactive polymer is the mass of polymer which has one equivalent of reactivity (often, the mass of polymer which corresponds to one mole of reactive side-chain groups). It is widely used to indicate the reactivity of polyol, isocyanate, or epoxy thermoset resins which would undergo crosslinking reactions through those functional groups.

It is particularly important for ion-exchange polymers (also called ion-exchange resins): one equivalent of an ion-exchange polymer will exchange one mole of singly charged ions, but only half a mole of doubly charged ions.
