= New chemical entity =

Novel drug undergoing clinical trials

A new chemical entity (NCE) is, according to the U.S. Food and Drug Administration, a novel, small, chemical molecule drug that is undergoing clinical trials or has received a first approval (not a new use) by the FDA in any other application submitted under section 505(b) of the Federal Food, Drug, and Cosmetic Act.

A new molecular entity (NME) is a broader term that encompasses both an NCE or an NBE (New Biological Entity).

== Definition ==
An active moiety is a molecule or ion, excluding those appended portions of the molecule that cause the drug to be an ester, salt (including a salt with hydrogen or coordination bonds), or other noncovalent derivative (such as a complex, chelate, or clathrate) of the molecule, responsible for the physiological or pharmacological action of the drug substance.

An NCE is a molecule developed by the innovator company in the early drug discovery stage, which after undergoing clinical trials could translate into a drug that could be a treatment for some disease. Synthesis of an NCE is the first step in the process of drug development. Once the synthesis of the NCE has been completed, companies have two options before them. They can either go for clinical trials on their own or license the NCE to another company. In the latter option, companies can avoid the expensive and lengthy process of clinical trials, as the licensee company would be conducting further clinical trials and subsequently launching the drug. Companies adopting this model of business would be able to generate high margins as they get a huge one-time payment for the NCE as well as entering into a revenue sharing agreement with the licensee company.

Under the Food and Drug Administration Amendments Act of 2007, all new chemical entities must first be reviewed by an advisory committee before the FDA can approve these products.

== See also ==
- Molecular/chemical entity
- Medicinal chemistry
- Drug development
