= Molecular entity =

Any type of particle that can undergo a chemical process

In chemistry and physics, a molecular entity, or chemical entity, is "any constitutionally or isotopically distinct atom, molecule, ion, ion pair, radical, radical ion, complex, conformer, etc., identifiable as a separately distinguishable entity". A molecular entity is any singular entity, irrespective of its nature, used to concisely express any type of chemical particle that can exemplify some process: for example, atoms, molecules, ions, etc. can all undergo a chemical reaction.

Chemical species is the macroscopic equivalent of molecular entity and refers to sets or ensembles of molecular entities.

According to IUPAC, "The degree of precision necessary to describe a molecular entity depends on the context. For example 'hydrogen molecule' is an adequate definition of a certain molecular entity for some purposes, whereas for others it is necessary to distinguish the electronic state and/or vibrational state and/or nuclear spin, etc. of the hydrogen molecule."

== See also ==
- Amount of substance - a quantity proportional to the number of entities in a substance
- Mole (unit) - an aggregate of entities given by the Avogadro number
- New chemical entity
- Chemical Entities of Biological Interest
- Particle
