= Carl Friedrich Wenzel =

German chemist (1740–1793)

Carl Friedrich Wenzel (c. 1740 – 26 February 1793) was a German chemist and metallurgist who determined the reaction rates of various chemicals, establishing, for example, that the amount of metal that dissolves in an acid is proportional to the concentration of acid in the solution. Thus he was the first person to give the notion of equivalent weight and to publish a table of equivalent weights of acids and bases. Later Jeremias Benjamin Richter produced a larger table of equivalent weights.

Wenzel, whose first name is also spelled Karl, was born at Dresden in 1740. Disliking his father's trade of bookbinding, for which he was intended, he left home in 1755, and after taking lessons in surgery and chemistry at Amsterdam, became a ship's surgeon in the Dutch service. In 1766, tired of sea-life, he went to study chemistry at Leipzig, and afterwards devoted himself to metallurgy and assaying at his native place with much success.

Thanks to that success, in 1780 Wenzel was appointed chemist to the Freiberg foundries by the elector of Saxony. In 1785 he became assessor to the superintending board of the foundries, and in 1786 chemist to the porcelain works at Meissen.

He died at Freiberg.

== Works ==
- Recepttaschenbuch für das Gebiet der Kinderkrankheiten . Vol. 1/2 . Palm & Enke, Erlangen 1829-1830 Digital edition by the University and State Library Düsseldorf
