= Conservation of mass =

Scientific law that a closed system's mass remains constant

In physics and chemistry, the law of conservation of mass or principle of mass conservation states that for any system which is closed to all incoming and outgoing transfers of matter, the mass of the system must remain constant over time.

The law implies that mass can neither be created nor destroyed, although it may be rearranged in space, or the entities associated with it may be changed in form. For example, in chemical reactions, the mass of the chemical components before the reaction is equal to the mass of the components after the reaction. Thus, during any chemical reaction and low-energy thermodynamic processes in an isolated system, the total mass of the reactants, or starting materials, must be equal to the mass of the products. The concept of mass conservation is widely used in many fields such as chemistry, mechanics, and fluid dynamics. Historically, mass conservation in chemical reactions was primarily demonstrated by Jean Rey (in 1630) and finally confirmed by Antoine Lavoisier in the late 18th century. The formulation of this law was of crucial importance in the progress from alchemy to the modern natural science of chemistry.

In general, mass is not conserved. The conservation of mass is a law that holds only in the classical limit. For example, the overlap of the electron and positron wave functions, where the interacting particles are nearly at rest, will proceed to annihilate via electromagnetic interaction. This process creates two photons and is the mechanism for PET scans.

Mass is also not generally conserved in open systems. Such is the case when any energy or matter is allowed into, or out of, the system. However, unless radioactivity or nuclear reactions are involved, the amount of energy entering or escaping such systems (as heat, mechanical work, or electromagnetic radiation) is usually too small to be measured as a change in the mass of the system.

For systems that include large gravitational fields, general relativity has to be taken into account; thus mass–energy conservation becomes a more complex concept, subject to different definitions, and neither mass nor energy is as strictly and simply conserved as is the case in special relativity.

== Formulation and examples ==
The law of conservation of mass can only be formulated in classical mechanics, in which the energy scales associated with an isolated system are much smaller than $mc^2$, where $m$ is the mass of a typical object in the system, measured in the frame of reference where the object is at rest, and $c$ is the speed of light in a vacuum.

The law can be formulated mathematically in the fields of fluid mechanics and continuum mechanics, where the conservation of mass is usually expressed using the continuity equation, given in differential form as
$$\frac{\partial \rho}{\partial t} + \nabla\cdot(\rho \mathbf{v}) = 0,$$
where $\rho$ is the density (mass per unit volume), $t$ is the time, $\nabla\cdot$ is the divergence, and $\mathbf{v}$ is the flow velocity field.

The interpretation of the continuity equation for mass is the following: For a given closed surface in the system, the change, over any time interval, of the mass enclosed by the surface is equal to the mass that traverses the surface during that time interval: positive if the matter goes in and negative if the matter goes out. For the whole isolated system, this condition implies that the total mass $M$, the sum of the masses of all components in the system, does not change over time, i.e.
$$\frac{\text{d}M}{\text{d}t} = \frac{\text{d}}{\text{d}t} \int \rho \, \text{d}V = 0,$$
where $\text{d}V$ is the differential that defines the integral over the whole volume of the system.

The continuity equation for the mass is part of the Euler equations of fluid dynamics. Many other convection–diffusion equations describe the conservation and flow of mass and matter in a given system.

In chemistry, the calculation of the amount of reactant and products in a chemical reaction, or stoichiometry, is founded on the principle of conservation of mass. The principle implies that during a chemical reaction the total mass of the reactants is equal to the total mass of the products. For example, in the following reaction

CH_{4} + 2 O_{2} → CO_{2} + 2 H_{2}O,

where one molecule of methane (CH_{4}) and two oxygen molecules O_{2} are converted into one molecule of carbon dioxide (CO_{2}) and two of water (H_{2}O). The number of molecules resulting from the reaction can be derived from the principle of conservation of mass, as initially four hydrogen atoms, 4 oxygen atoms and one carbon atom are present (as well as in the final state); thus the number water molecules produced must be exactly two per molecule of carbon dioxide produced.

Many engineering problems are solved by following the mass distribution of a given system over time; this methodology is known as mass balance.

== History ==
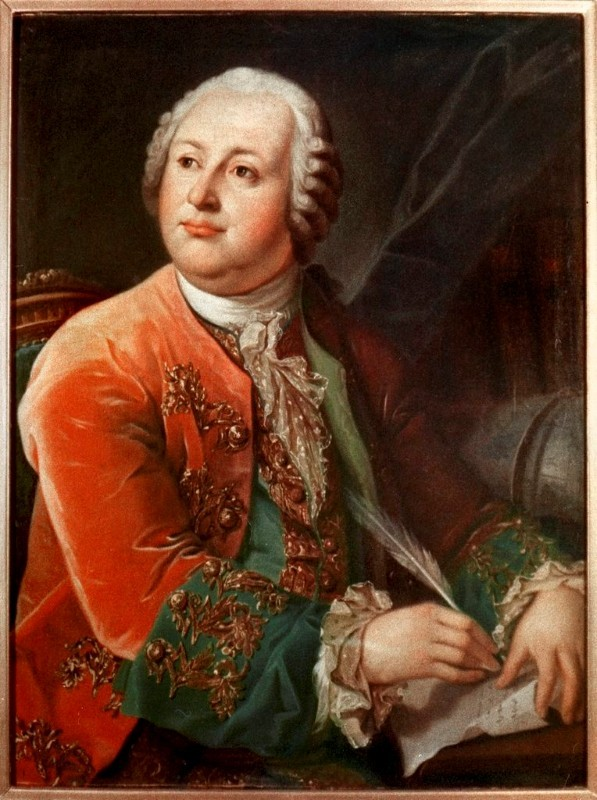
Russian scientist Mikhail Lomonosov formulated the law of mass conservation in 1756 and came to the conclusion that the phlogiston theory is incorrect.

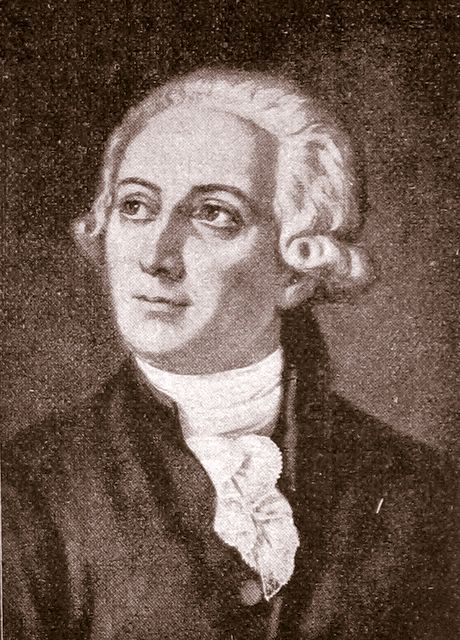
Antoine Lavoisier's discovery of the law of conservation of mass led to many new findings in the 19th century. Joseph Proust's law of definite proportions and John Dalton's atomic theory branched from the discoveries of Antoine Lavoisier. Lavoisier's quantitative experiments revealed that combustion involved oxygen rather than what was previously thought to be phlogiston.

As early as 520 BCE, Jain philosophy, a non-creationist philosophy based on the teachings of Mahavira, stated that the universe and its constituents such as matter cannot be destroyed or created. The Jain text Tattvarthasutra (2nd century CE) states that a substance is permanent, but its modes are characterised by creation and destruction.

An important idea in ancient Greek philosophy was that "Nothing comes from nothing", so that what exists now has always existed: no new matter can come into existence where there was none before. An explicit statement of this, along with the further principle that nothing can pass away into nothing, is found in Empedocles (c. 4th century BCE): "For it is impossible for anything to come to be from what is not, and it cannot be brought about or heard of that what is should be utterly destroyed."

A further principle of conservation was stated by Epicurus around the 3rd century BCE, who wrote in describing the nature of the Universe that "the totality of things was always such as it is now, and always will be".

=== Discoveries in chemistry ===
By the 18th century the principle of conservation of mass during chemical reactions was widely used and was an important assumption during experiments, even before a definition was widely established, though an expression of the law can be dated back to Hero of Alexandria's time, as can be seen in the works of Joseph Black, Henry Cavendish, and Jean Rey. One of the first to outline the principle was Mikhail Lomonosov in 1756. He may have demonstrated it by experiments and certainly had discussed the principle in 1748 in correspondence with Leonhard Euler, though his claim on the subject is sometimes challenged. According to the Soviet physicist Yakov Dorfman:

The universal law was formulated by Lomonosov on the basis of general philosophical materialistic considerations, it was never questioned or tested by him, but on the contrary, served him as a solid starting position in all research throughout his life.

A more refined series of experiments were later carried out by Antoine Lavoisier who expressed his conclusion in 1773 and popularized the principle of conservation of mass. The demonstrations of the principle disproved the then popular phlogiston theory that said that mass could be gained or lost in combustion and heat processes.

The conservation of mass was obscure for millennia because of the buoyancy effect of the Earth's atmosphere on the weight of gases. For example, a piece of wood weighs less after burning; this seemed to suggest that some of its mass disappears, or is transformed or lost. Careful experiments were performed in which chemical reactions such as rusting were allowed to take place in sealed glass ampoules; it was found that the chemical reaction did not change the weight of the sealed container and its contents. Weighing of gases using scales was not possible until the invention of the vacuum pump in the 17th century.

Once understood, the conservation of mass was of great importance in progressing from alchemy to modern chemistry. Once early chemists realized that chemical substances never disappeared but were only transformed into other substances with the same weight, these scientists could for the first time embark on quantitative studies of the transformations of substances. The idea of mass conservation plus a surmise that certain "elemental substances" also could not be transformed into others by chemical reactions, in turn led to an understanding of chemical elements, as well as the idea that all chemical processes and transformations (such as burning and metabolic reactions) are reactions between invariant amounts or weights of these chemical elements.

Following the pioneering work of Lavoisier, the exhaustive experiments of Jean Stas supported the consistency of this law in chemical reactions, even though they were carried out with other intentions. His research indicated that in certain reactions the loss or gain could not have been more than 2 to 4 parts in 100,000. The difference in the accuracy aimed at and attained by Lavoisier on the one hand, and by Edward W. Morley and Stas on the other, is enormous.

=== Modern physics ===
The law of conservation of mass was challenged with the advent of special relativity. In one of the Annus Mirabilis papers of Albert Einstein in 1905, he suggested an equivalence between mass and energy. This theory implied several assertions, like the idea that internal energy of a system could contribute to the mass of the whole system, or that mass could be converted into electromagnetic radiation. However, as Max Planck pointed out, a change in mass as a result of extraction or addition of chemical energy, as predicted by Einstein's theory, is so small that it could not be measured with the available instruments and could not be presented as a test of special relativity. Einstein speculated that the energies associated with newly discovered radioactivity were significant enough, compared with the mass of systems producing them, to enable their change of mass to be measured, once the energy of the reaction had been removed from the system. This later indeed proved to be possible, although it was eventually to be the first artificial nuclear transmutation reaction in 1932, demonstrated by Cockcroft and Walton, that proved the first successful test of Einstein's theory regarding mass loss with energy gain.

The law of conservation of mass and the analogous law of conservation of energy were finally generalized and unified into the principle of mass–energy equivalence, described by Albert Einstein's equation $E = mc^2$. Special relativity also redefines the concept of mass and energy, which can be used interchangeably and are defined relative to the frame of reference. Several quantities had to be defined for consistency, such as the rest mass of a particle (mass in the rest frame of the particle) and the relativistic mass (in another frame). The latter term is usually less frequently used.

In general relativity, conservation of both mass and energy is not globally conserved and its definition is more complicated.

== See also ==
- Charge conservation
- Conservation law
- Fick's laws of diffusion
- Law of definite proportions
- Law of multiple proportions
