= Stoichiometry =

Calculation of relative masses of reactants and products in chemical reactions

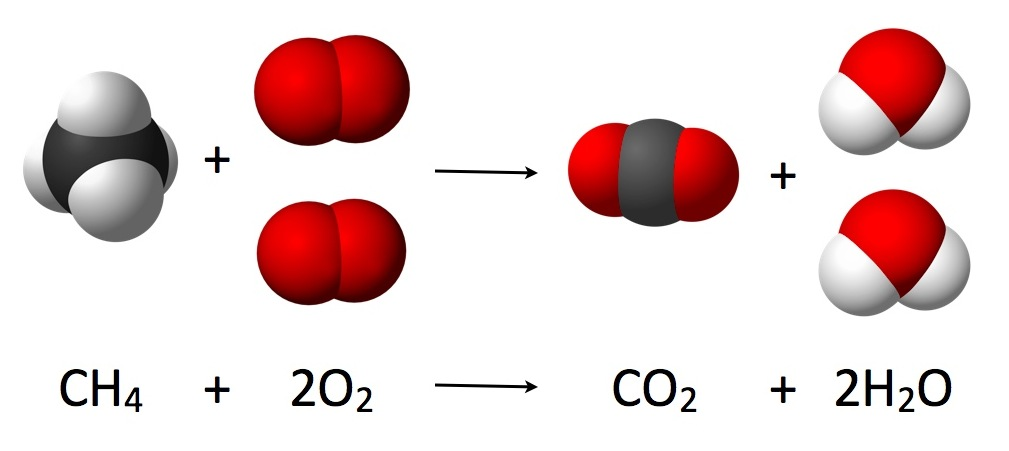
A stoichiometric diagram of the combustion reaction of methane

Stoichiometry (/ˌstɔɪkiˈɒmɪtri/) is the relationships between the quantities of reactants and products before, during and after chemical reactions.

Stoichiometry is based on the law of conservation of mass; the total mass of reactants must equal the total mass of products, so the relationship between reactants and products must form a ratio of positive integers. This means that if the amounts of the separate reactants are known, then the amount of the product can be calculated. Conversely, if one reactant has a known quantity and the quantity of the products can be empirically determined, then the amount of the other reactants can also be calculated.

This is illustrated in the image here, where the unbalanced equation is:

CH_{4} (g) + O_{2} (g) → CO_{2} (g) + H_{2}O (l)
However, the current equation is imbalanced. The reactants have 4 hydrogen and 2 oxygen atoms, while the product has 2 hydrogen and 3 oxygen. To balance the hydrogen, a coefficient of 2 is added to the product H_{2}O, and to fix the imbalance of oxygen, it is also added to O_{2}. Thus, we get:
CH_{4} (g) + 2 O_{2} (g) → CO_{2} (g) + 2 H_{2}O (l)

Here, one molecule of methane reacts with two molecules of oxygen gas to yield one molecule of carbon dioxide and two molecules of liquid water. This particular chemical equation is an example of complete combustion. The numbers in front of each quantity are a set of stoichiometric coefficients which directly reflect the molar ratios between the products and reactants. Stoichiometry measures these quantitative relationships, and is used to determine the amount of products and reactants that are produced or needed in a given reaction.

Describing the quantitative relationships among substances as they participate in chemical reactions is known as reaction stoichiometry. In the example above, reaction stoichiometry measures the relationship between the quantities of methane and oxygen that react to form carbon dioxide and water: for every mole of methane combusted, two moles of oxygen are consumed, one mole of carbon dioxide is produced, and two moles of water are produced.

Because of the well-known relationship of moles to atomic weights, the ratios that are arrived at by stoichiometry can be used to determine quantities by weight in a reaction described by a balanced equation. This is called composition stoichiometry.

Gas stoichiometry deals with reactions solely involving gases, where the gases are at a known temperature, pressure, and volume and can be assumed to be ideal gases. For gases, the volume ratio is ideally the same by the ideal gas law, but the mass ratio of a single reaction has to be calculated from the molecular masses of the reactants and products. In practice, because of the existence of isotopes, molar masses are used instead in calculating the mass ratio.

== Etymology ==
The term stoichiometry was first used by Jeremias Benjamin Richter in 1792 when the first volume of Richter's Anfangsgründe der Stöchyometrie oder Meßkunst chymischer Elemente (German for 'Fundamentals of Stoichiometry, or the Art of Measuring the Chemical Elements') was published. The term is derived from the Ancient Greek words στοιχεῖον (stoikheîon), meaning 'element', and μέτρον (métron), meaning 'measure'. Ludwig Darmstaedter and Ralph E. Oesper have written a useful account on this.

== Definitions ==
A stoichiometric amount or stoichiometric ratio of a reagent is the optimum amount or ratio where, assuming that the reaction proceeds to completion:

1. All of the reagent is consumed
2. There is no deficiency of the reagent
3. There is no excess of the reagent.

Stoichiometry rests upon the very laws that help to understand it better, i.e., law of conservation of mass, the law of definite proportions (i.e., the law of constant composition), the law of multiple proportions and the law of reciprocal proportions. In general chemical reactions combine in definite ratios of chemicals. Since chemical reactions can neither create nor destroy matter, nor transmute one element into another, the amount of each element must be the same throughout the overall reaction. For example, the number of atoms of a given element X on the reactant side must equal the number of atoms of that element on the product side, whether or not all of those atoms are involved in a reaction.

Chemical reactions, as macroscopic unit operations, consist of many elementary reactions, where a single molecule reacts with another molecule. As the reacting molecules (or formula units or ion pairs) consist of a definite set of atoms in an integer ratio, the ratio between reactants in a complete reaction is also in an integer ratio. A reaction may consume more than one molecule, and the stoichiometric number counts this number, defined as positive for products (added) and negative for reactants (removed). The unsigned coefficients are generally referred to as the stoichiometric coefficients.

Each element has an atomic mass (usually given as an average in the form of the standard atomic weight), and considering molecules as collections of atoms, every compound has a molecular mass (if molecular) or formula mass (if non-molecular), which when expressed in daltons is numerically equal to the molar mass in g/mol. By definition, the atomic mass of carbon-12 is exactly 12 Da, making its molar mass 12 g/mol. The number of chemical entities per mole in a substance is given by the Avogadro constant, exactly 6.02214076×10^{23} mol^{−1} since the 2019 revision of the SI. Thus, to calculate the stoichiometry by mass, the number of molecules required for each reactant is expressed in moles and multiplied by the molar mass of each to give the mass of each reactant per mole of reaction. The mass ratios can be calculated by dividing each by the total in the whole reaction.

Elements in their natural state are mixtures of isotopes of differing mass; thus, atomic masses and thus molar masses are not exactly integers. For instance, instead of an exact 14:3 proportion, 17.031 g of ammonia consists of 14.007 g of nitrogen and 3 × 1.008 g of hydrogen, because natural nitrogen includes a small amount of nitrogen-15, and natural hydrogen includes hydrogen-2 (deuterium).

A stoichiometric reactant is a reactant that is consumed in a reaction, as opposed to a catalytic reactant, which is not consumed in the overall reaction because it reacts in one step and is regenerated in another step.

== Converting grams to moles ==
Stoichiometry is not only used to balance chemical equations but also used in "conversions" between quantities of a substance by dimensional analysis, e.g., converting from grams to moles using molar mass as the "conversion factor", or from grams to milliliters using density. For example, to express 2.00 g of NaCl (sodium chloride) as an amount (in moles), one would do the following:

$$\frac{2.00 \mbox{ g NaCl}}{58.44 \mbox{ g/mol}} = 0.0342 \ \text{mol NaCl}$$

In the above example, when written out in fraction form, the units of grams form a multiplicative identity, which is equivalent to one (g/g = 1), with the resulting amount in moles (the unit that was needed), as shown in the following equation,

$$\left(\frac{2.00 \mbox{ g NaCl}}{1}\right)\left(\frac{1 \mbox{ mol NaCl}}{58.44 \mbox{ g NaCl}}\right) = 0.0342\ \text{mol NaCl}$$

== Molar proportion ==
Stoichiometry is often used to balance chemical equations (reaction stoichiometry). For example, the two diatomic gases, hydrogen and oxygen, can combine to form a liquid, water, in an exothermic reaction, as described by the following equation:

2 H_{2} + O_{2} → 2 H_{2}O

Reaction stoichiometry describes the 2:1:2 ratio of hydrogen, oxygen, and water molecules in the above equation.

The molar ratio allows for conversion between moles of one substance and moles of another. For example, in the reaction

2 CH_{3}OH + 3 O_{2} → 2 CO_{2} + 4 H_{2}O

the amount of water that will be produced by the combustion of 0.27 moles of CH_{3}OH is obtained using the molar ratio between CH_{3}OH and H_{2}O of 2 to 4.

$$\left(\frac{0.27 \mbox{ mol }\mathrm{CH_3OH}}{1}\right)\left(\frac{4 \mbox{ mol }\mathrm{H_2O}}{2 \mbox{ mol } \mathrm{CH_3OH}}\right) = 0.54\ \text{mol }\mathrm{H_2O}$$

The term stoichiometry is also often used for the molar proportions of elements in stoichiometric compounds (composition stoichiometry). For example, the stoichiometry of hydrogen and oxygen in H_{2}O is 2:1. In stoichiometric compounds, the molar proportions are whole numbers.

== Determining amount of product ==
Stoichiometry can also be used to find the quantity of a product yielded by a reaction. If a piece of solid copper (Cu) were added to an aqueous solution of silver nitrate (AgNO_{3}), the silver (Ag) would be replaced in a single displacement reaction forming aqueous copper(II) nitrate (Cu(NO_{3})_{2}) and solid silver. How much silver is produced if 16.00 grams of Cu is added to the solution of excess silver nitrate?

The following steps would be used:

1. Write and balance the equation
2. Mass to moles: Convert grams of Cu to moles of Cu
3. Mole ratio: Convert moles of Cu to moles of Ag produced
4. Mole to mass: Convert moles of Ag to grams of Ag produced

The complete balanced equation would be:

Cu + 2 AgNO_{3} → Cu(NO_{3})_{2} + 2 Ag

For the mass to mole step, the mass of copper (16.00 g) would be converted to moles of copper by dividing the mass of copper by its molar mass: 63.55 g/mol.

$$\left(\frac{16.00 \mbox{ g Cu}}{1}\right)\left(\frac{1 \mbox{ mol Cu}}{63.55 \mbox{ g Cu}}\right) = 0.2518\ \text{mol Cu}$$

Now that the amount of Cu in moles (0.2518) is found, we can set up the mole ratio. This is found by looking at the coefficients in the balanced equation: Cu and Ag are in a 1:2 ratio.

$$\left(\frac{0.2518 \mbox{ mol Cu}}{1}\right)\left(\frac{2 \mbox{ mol Ag}}{1 \mbox{ mol Cu}}\right) = 0.5036\ \text{mol Ag}$$

Now that the moles of Ag produced is known to be 0.5036 mol, we convert this amount to grams of Ag produced to come to the final answer:

$$\left(\frac{0.5036 \mbox{ mol Ag}}{1}\right)\left(\frac{107.87  \mbox{ g Ag}}{1 \mbox{ mol Ag}}\right) = 54.32 \ \text{g Ag}$$

This set of calculations can be further condensed into a single step:

$$m_\mathrm{Ag} = \left(\frac{16.00 \mbox{ g }\mathrm{Cu}}{1}\right)\left(\frac{1 \mbox{ mol }\mathrm{Cu}}{63.55 \mbox{ g }\mathrm{Cu}}\right)\left(\frac{2 \mbox{ mol }\mathrm{Ag}}{1 \mbox{ mol }\mathrm{Cu}}\right)\left(\frac{107.87 \mbox{ g }\mathrm{Ag}}{1 \mbox{ mol Ag}}\right) = 54.32 \mbox{ g}$$

=== Further examples ===
For propane (C_{3}H_{8}) reacting with oxygen gas (O_{2}), the balanced chemical equation is:

C_{3}H_{8} + 5 O_{2} → 3 CO_{2} + 4 H_{2}O

The mass of water formed if 120 g of propane (C_{3}H_{8}) is burned in excess oxygen is then

$$m_\mathrm{H_2O} = \left(\frac{120. \mbox{ g }\mathrm{C_3H_8}}{1}\right)\left(\frac{1 \mbox{ mol }\mathrm{C_3H_8}}{44.09 \mbox{ g }\mathrm{C_3H_8}}\right)\left(\frac{4 \mbox{ mol }\mathrm{H_2O}}{1 \mbox{ mol }\mathrm{C_3H_8}}\right)\left(\frac{18.02 \mbox{ g }\mathrm{H_2O}}{1 \mbox{ mol }\mathrm{H_2O}}\right) = 196 \mbox{ g}$$

== Stoichiometric ratio ==
Stoichiometry is also used to find the right amount of one reactant to "completely" react with the other reactant in a chemical reaction – that is, the stoichiometric amounts that would result in no leftover reactants when the reaction takes place. An example is shown below using the thermite reaction,

Fe_{2}O_{3} + 2 Al → Al_{2}O_{3} + 2 Fe

This equation shows that 1 mole of iron(III) oxide and 2 moles of aluminium will produce 1 mole of aluminium oxide and 2 moles of iron. So, to completely react with 85.0 g of iron(III) oxide (0.532 mol), 28.7 g (1.06 mol) of aluminium are needed.

$$m_\mathrm{Al} = \left(\frac{85.0 \mbox{ g }\mathrm{Fe_2O_3}}{1}\right)\left(\frac{1 \mbox{ mol }\mathrm{Fe_2 O_3}}{159.7 \mbox{ g }\mathrm{Fe_2 O_3}}\right)\left(\frac{2 \mbox{ mol Al}}{1 \mbox{ mol }\mathrm{Fe_2 O_3}}\right)\left(\frac{26.98 \mbox{ g Al}}{1 \mbox{ mol Al}}\right) = 28.7 \mbox{ g}$$

== Limiting reagent and percent yield ==
The limiting reagent is the reagent that limits the amount of product that can be formed and is completely consumed when the reaction is complete. An excess reactant is a reactant that is left over once the reaction has stopped due to the limiting reactant being exhausted.

Consider the equation of roasting lead(II) sulfide (PbS) in oxygen (O_{2}) to produce lead(II) oxide (PbO) and sulfur dioxide (SO_{2}):

2 PbS + 3 O_{2} → 2 PbO + 2 SO_{2}

To determine the theoretical yield of lead(II) oxide if 200.0 g of lead(II) sulfide and 200.0 g of oxygen are heated in an open container:

$$m_\mathrm{PbO} = \left(\frac{200.0 \mbox{ g }\mathrm{PbS}}{1}\right)\left(\frac{1 \mbox{ mol }\mathrm{PbS}}{239.27 \mbox{ g }\mathrm{PbS}}\right)\left(\frac{2 \mbox{ mol }\mathrm{PbO}}{2 \mbox{ mol }\mathrm{PbS}}\right)\left(\frac{223.2 \mbox{ g }\mathrm{PbO}}{1 \mbox{ mol }\mathrm{PbO}}\right) = 186.6 \mbox{ g}$$
$$m_\mathrm{PbO} = \left(\frac{200.0 \mbox{ g }\mathrm{O_2}}{1}\right)\left(\frac{1 \mbox{ mol }\mathrm{O_2}}{32.00 \mbox{ g }\mathrm{O_2}}\right)\left(\frac{2 \mbox{ mol }\mathrm{PbO}}{3 \mbox{ mol }\mathrm{O_2}}\right)\left(\frac{223.2 \mbox{ g }\mathrm{PbO}}{1 \mbox{ mol }\mathrm{PbO}}\right) = 930.0 \mbox{ g}$$

Because a lesser amount of PbO is produced for the 200.0 g of PbS, it is clear that PbS is the limiting reagent.

In reality, the actual yield is not the same as the stoichiometrically-calculated theoretical yield. Percent yield, then, is expressed in the following equation:

$$\mbox{percent yield} = \frac{\mbox{actual yield}}{\mbox{theoretical yield}}$$

If 170.0 g of lead(II) oxide is obtained, then the percent yield would be calculated as follows:

$$\mbox{percent yield} = \frac{\mbox{170.0 g PbO}}{\mbox{186.6 g PbO}} = 91.12\%$$

=== Example ===
Consider the following reaction, in which iron(III) chloride reacts with hydrogen sulfide to produce iron(III) sulfide and hydrogen chloride:

2 FeCl_{3} + 3 H_{2}S → Fe_{2}S_{3} + 6 HCl

The stoichiometric masses for this reaction are:

324.41 g FeCl_{3}, 102.25 g H_{2}S, 207.89 g Fe_{2}S_{3}, 218.77 g HCl

Suppose 90.0 g of FeCl_{3} reacts with 52.0 g of H_{2}S. To find the limiting reagent and the mass of HCl produced by the reaction, we change the above amounts by a factor of 90/324.41 and obtain the following amounts:

90.00 g FeCl_{3}, 28.37 g H_{2}S, 57.67 g Fe_{2}S_{3}, 60.69 g HCl

The limiting reactant (or reagent) is FeCl_{3}, since all 90.00 g of it is used up while only 28.37 g H_{2}S are consumed. Thus, 52.0 − 28.4 = 23.6 g H_{2}S left in excess. The mass of HCl produced is 60.7 g.

By looking at the stoichiometry of the reaction, one might have guessed FeCl_{3} being the limiting reactant; three times more FeCl_{3} is used compared to H_{2}S (324 g vs 102 g).

== Different stoichiometries in competing reactions ==
Often, more than one reaction is possible given the same starting materials. The reactions may differ in their stoichiometry. For example, the methylation of benzene (C_{6}H_{6}), through a Friedel–Crafts reaction using AlCl_{3} as a catalyst, may produce singly methylated (C_{6}H_{5}CH_{3}), doubly methylated (C_{6}H_{4}(CH_{3})_{2}), or still more highly methylated (C_{6}H_{6−n}(CH_{3})_{n}) products, as shown in the following example,

C_{6}H_{6} + CH_{3}Cl → C_{6}H_{5}CH_{3} + HCl
C_{6}H_{6} + 2 CH_{3}Cl → C_{6}H_{4}(CH_{3})_{2} + 2 HCl
C_{6}H_{6} + n CH_{3}Cl → C_{6}H_{6−n}(CH_{3})_{n} + n HCl

In this example, which reaction takes place is controlled in part by the relative concentrations of the reactants.

== Stoichiometric coefficient and stoichiometric number ==
In lay terms, the stoichiometric coefficient of any given component is the number of molecules and/or formula units that participate in the reaction as written. A related concept is the stoichiometric number (using IUPAC nomenclature), wherein the stoichiometric coefficient is multiplied by +1 for all products and by −1 for all reactants.

For example, in the reaction CH_{4} + 2 O_{2} → CO_{2} + 2 H_{2}O, the stoichiometric number of CH_{4} is −1, the stoichiometric number of O_{2} is −2, for CO_{2} it would be +1 and for H_{2}O it is +2.

In more technically precise terms, the stoichiometric number in a chemical reaction system of the i-th component is defined as

$$\nu_i = \frac{\Delta N_i}{\Delta \xi} \,$$

or

$$\Delta N_i = \nu_i \, \Delta \xi  \,$$

where $N_i$ is the number of molecules of i, and $\xi$ is the progress variable or extent of reaction.

The stoichiometric number $\nu_i$ represents the degree to which a chemical species participates in a reaction. The convention is to assign negative numbers to reactants (which are consumed) and positive ones to products, consistent with the convention that increasing the extent of reaction will correspond to shifting the composition from reactants towards products. However, any reaction may be viewed as going in the reverse direction, and in that point of view, would change in the negative direction in order to lower the system's Gibbs free energy. Whether a reaction actually will go in the arbitrarily selected forward direction or not depends on the amounts of the substances present at any given time, which determines the kinetics and thermodynamics, i.e., whether equilibrium lies to the right or the left of the initial state,

In reaction mechanisms, stoichiometric coefficients for each step are always integers, since elementary reactions always involve whole molecules. If one uses a composite representation of an overall reaction, some may be rational fractions. There are often chemical species present that do not participate in a reaction; their stoichiometric coefficients are therefore zero. Any chemical species that is regenerated, such as a catalyst, also has a stoichiometric coefficient of zero.

The simplest possible case is an isomerization

A → B

in which ν_{B} = 1 since one molecule of B is produced each time the reaction occurs, while ν_{A} = −1 since one molecule of A is necessarily consumed. In any chemical reaction, not only is the total mass conserved but also the numbers of atoms of each kind are conserved, and this imposes corresponding constraints on possible values for the stoichiometric coefficients.

There are usually multiple reactions proceeding simultaneously in any natural reaction system, including those in biology. Since any chemical component can participate in several reactions simultaneously, the stoichiometric number of the i-th component in the k-th reaction is defined as

$$\nu_{ik} = \frac{\partial N_i}{\partial \xi_k} \,$$

so that the total (differential) change in the amount of the i-th component is

$$dN_i = \sum_k \nu_{ik} \, d\xi_k. \,$$

Extents of reaction provide the clearest and most explicit way of representing compositional change, although they are not yet widely used.

With complex reaction systems, it is often useful to consider both the representation of a reaction system in terms of the amounts of the chemicals present { N_{i} } (state variables), and the representation in terms of the actual compositional degrees of freedom, as expressed by the extents of reaction { ξ_{k} }. The transformation from a vector expressing the extents to a vector expressing the amounts uses a rectangular matrix whose elements are the stoichiometric numbers [ ν_{i k} ].

The maximum and minimum for any ξ_{k} occur whenever the first of the reactants is depleted for the forward reaction; or the first of the "products" is depleted if the reaction as viewed as being pushed in the reverse direction. This is a purely kinematic restriction on the reaction simplex, a hyperplane in composition space, or N‑space, whose dimensionality equals the number of linearly-independent chemical reactions. This is necessarily less than the number of chemical components, since each reaction manifests a relation between at least two chemicals. The accessible region of the hyperplane depends on the amounts of each chemical species actually present, a contingent fact. Different such amounts can even generate different hyperplanes, all sharing the same algebraic stoichiometry.

In accord with the principles of chemical kinetics and thermodynamic equilibrium, every chemical reaction is reversible, at least to some degree, so that each equilibrium point must be an interior point of the simplex. As a consequence, extrema for the ξs will not occur unless an experimental system is prepared with zero initial amounts of some products.

The number of physically-independent reactions can be even greater than the number of chemical components, and depends on the various reaction mechanisms. For example, there may be two (or more) reaction paths for the isomerism above. The reaction may occur by itself, but faster and with different intermediates, in the presence of a catalyst.

The (dimensionless) "units" may be taken to be molecules or moles. Moles are most commonly used, but it is more suggestive to picture incremental chemical reactions in terms of molecules. The Ns and ξs are reduced to molar units by dividing by the Avogadro constant. While dimensional mass units may be used, the comments about integers are then no longer applicable.

== Stoichiometry matrix ==
In complex reactions, stoichiometries are often represented in a more compact form called the stoichiometry matrix. The stoichiometry matrix is denoted by the symbol N.

If a reaction network has n reactions and m participating molecular species, then the stoichiometry matrix will have correspondingly m rows and n columns.

For example, consider the system of reactions shown below:

S_{1} → S_{2}
5 S_{3} + S_{2} → 4 S_{3} + 2 S_{2}
S_{3} → S_{4}
S_{4} → S_{5}

This system comprises four reactions and five different molecular species. The stoichiometry matrix for this system can be written as:

$$\mathbf{N} = \begin{bmatrix}
-1 &  0 &  0 & 0 \\
1 &  1 &  0 & 0 \\
0 & -1 & -1 & 0 \\
0 &  0 &  1 & -1 \\
0 &  0 &  0 & 1 \\
\end{bmatrix}$$

where the rows correspond to S_{1}, S_{2}, S_{3}, S_{4} and S_{5}, respectively. The process of converting a reaction scheme into a stoichiometry matrix can be a lossy transformation: for example, the stoichiometries in the second reaction simplify when included in the matrix. This means that it is not always possible to recover the original reaction scheme from a stoichiometry matrix.

Often the stoichiometry matrix is combined with the rate vector, v, and the species vector, x to form a compact equation, the biochemical systems equation, describing the rates of change of the molecular species:

$$\frac{d\mathbf{x}}{dt} = \mathbf{N} \cdot \mathbf{v}.$$

== Gas stoichiometry ==
Gas stoichiometry is the quantitative relationship (ratio) between reactants and products in a chemical reaction with reactions that produce gases. Gas stoichiometry applies when the gases produced are assumed to be ideal, and the temperature, pressure, and volume of the gases are all known. The ideal gas law is used for these calculations. Often, but not always, the standard temperature and pressure (STP) are taken as 0 °C and 1 bar and used as the conditions for gas stoichiometric calculations.

Gas stoichiometry calculations solve for the unknown volume or mass of a gaseous product or reactant. For example, if we wanted to calculate the volume of gaseous NO_{2} produced from the combustion of 100 g of NH_{3}, by the reaction:

4 NH_{3} (g) + 7 O_{2} (g) → 4 NO_{2} (g) + 6 H_{2}O (l)

we would carry out the following calculations:

$$100\, \mathrm{g\, NH_3}\cdot\frac{1\, \mathrm{mol\, NH_3}}{17.034\, \mathrm{g\, NH_3}}=5.871\, \mathrm{mol\, NH_3}$$

There is a 1:1 molar ratio of NH_{3} to NO_{2} in the above balanced combustion reaction, so 5.871 mol of NO_{2} will be formed. We will employ the ideal gas law to solve for the volume at 0 °C (273.15 K) and 1 atmosphere using the gas law constant of R = 0.08206 L·atm·K^{−1}·mol^{−1}:

$$\begin{align}
PV&= nRT\\
V&= \frac{nRT}{P}\\
&= \frac{5.871\text{ mol}\cdot 0.08206\,\frac{\mathrm{L\cdot atm}}{\mathrm{mol\cdot K}}\cdot 273.15\text{ K}}{1\text{ atm}}\\
&= 131.597\, \mathrm{L\, NO_2}
\end{align}$$

Gas stoichiometry often involves having to know the molar mass of a gas, given the density of that gas. The ideal gas law can be re-arranged to obtain a relation between the density and the molar mass of an ideal gas:

$\rho = \frac{m}{V}$ and $n = \frac{m}{M}$

and thus:

$$\rho = \frac {M P}{R\,T}$$

where:

- P = absolute gas pressure
- V = gas volume
- n = amount (measured in moles)
- R = universal ideal gas law constant
- T = absolute gas temperature
- ρ = gas density at T and P
- m = mass of gas
- M = molar mass of gas

== Stoichiometric air-to-fuel ratios of common fuels ==
In the combustion reaction, oxygen reacts with the fuel, and the point where exactly all oxygen is consumed and all fuel burned is defined as the stoichiometric point. With more oxygen (overstoichiometric combustion), some of it stays unreacted. Likewise, if the combustion is incomplete due to lack of sufficient oxygen, fuel remains unreacted. (Unreacted fuel may also remain due to physical rather than chemical factors, such as slow combustion or insufficient mixing of fuel and oxygen – this is not due to stoichiometry.) Different hydrocarbon fuels have different contents of carbon, hydrogen and other elements, thus their stoichiometry varies.

Oxygen makes up only 20.95% of the volume of air, and only 23.20% of its mass. The air-fuel ratios listed below are much higher than the equivalent oxygen-fuel ratios, due to the high proportion of inert gasses in the air. (The ratio of 14.7 as listed for gasoline only applies for combustion in combination with a catalytic converter.)

Fuel	Ratio by mass	Ratio by volume	Percent fuel by mass	Main reaction
Gasoline	14.7 : 1	—	6.9%	2 C_{8}H_{18} + 25 O_{2} → 16 CO_{2} + 18 H_{2}O
Natural gas	14.5 : 1	9.7 : 1	6.9%	CH_{4} + 2 O_{2} → CO_{2} + 2 H_{2}O
Propane (LP)	15.67 : 1	23.9 : 1	6.45%	C_{3}H_{8} + 5 O_{2} → 3 CO_{2} + 4 H_{2}O
Ethanol	9 : 1	—	11.1%	C_{2}H_{6}O + 3 O_{2} → 2 CO_{2} + 3 H_{2}O
Methanol	6.47 : 1	—	15.6%	2 CH_{4}O + 3 O_{2} → 2 CO_{2} + 4 H_{2}O
n-Butanol	11.2 : 1	—	8.2%	C_{4}H_{10}O + 6 O_{2} → 4 CO_{2} + 5 H_{2}O
Hydrogen	34.3 : 1	2.39 : 1	2.9%	2 H_{2} + O_{2} → 2 H_{2}O
Diesel	14.5 : 1	—	6.8%	2 C_{12}H_{26} + 37 O_{2} → 24 CO_{2} + 26 H_{2}O
Methane	17.23 : 1	9.52 : 1	5.5%	CH_{4} + 2 O_{2} → CO_{2} + 2 H_{2}O
Acetylene	13.26 : 1	11.92 : 1	7.0%	2 C_{2}H_{2} + 5 O_{2} → 4 CO_{2} + 2 H_{2}O
Ethane	16.07 : 1	16.68 : 1	5.9%	2 C_{2}H_{6} + 7 O_{2} → 4 CO_{2} + 6 H_{2}O
Butane	15.44 : 1	30.98 : 1	6.1%	2 C_{4}H_{10} + 13 O_{2} → 8 CO_{2} + 10 H_{2}O
Pentane	15.31 : 1	38.13 : 1	6.1%	C_{5}H_{12} + 8 O_{2} → 5 CO_{2} + 6 H_{2}O

Gasoline engines can run at stoichiometric air-to-fuel ratio, because gasoline is quite volatile and is mixed (sprayed or carburetted) with the air prior to ignition. Diesel engines, in contrast, run lean, with more air available than simple stoichiometry would require. Diesel fuel is less volatile and is effectively burned as it is injected.

== See also ==
- Non-stoichiometric compound
- Biochemical systems equation
- Chemical reaction
- Chemical equation
- Molecule
- Molar mass
- Ideal gas law
