= Law of multiple proportions =

1804 observation in physical chemistry

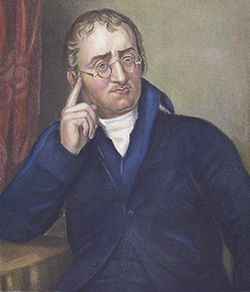
John Dalton

In chemistry, the law of multiple proportions states that in compounds which contain two particular chemical elements, the amount of Element A per measure of Element B will differ across these compounds by ratios of small whole numbers. For instance, the ratio of the hydrogen content in methane (CH_{4}) and ethane (C_{2}H_{6}) per measure of carbon is 4:3. This law is also known as Dalton's Law, named after John Dalton, the chemist who first expressed it. The discovery of this pattern led Dalton to develop the modern theory of atoms, as it suggested that the elements combine with each other in multiples of a basic quantity. Along with the law of definite proportions, the law of multiple proportions forms the basis of stoichiometry.

The law of multiple proportions often does not apply when comparing very large molecules. For example, if one tried to demonstrate it using the hydrocarbons decane (C_{10}H_{22}) and undecane (C_{11}H_{24}), one would find that 100 grams of carbon could react with 18.46 grams of hydrogen to produce decane or with 18.31 grams of hydrogen to produce undecane, for a ratio of hydrogen masses of 121:120, which is hardly a ratio of "small" whole numbers.

== History ==
In 1804, Dalton explained his atomic theory to his friend and fellow chemist Thomas Thomson, who published an explanation of Dalton's theory in his book A System of Chemistry in 1807. According to Thomson, Dalton's idea first occurred to him when experimenting with "olefiant gas" (ethylene) and "carburetted hydrogen gas" (methane). Dalton found that "carburetted hydrogen gas" contains twice as much hydrogen per measure of carbon as "olefiant gas", and concluded that a molecule of "olefiant gas" is one carbon atom and one hydrogen atom, and a molecule of "carburetted hydrogen gas" is one carbon atom and two hydrogen atoms. In reality, an ethylene molecule has two carbon atoms and four hydrogen atoms (C_{2}H_{4}), and a methane molecule has one carbon atom and four hydrogen atoms (CH_{4}). In this particular case, Dalton was mistaken about the formulas of these compounds, and it wasn't his only mistake. But in other cases, he got their formulas right. The following examples come from Dalton's own books A New System of Chemical Philosophy (in two volumes, 1808 and 1817):

Example 1 — tin oxides: Dalton identified two types of tin oxide. One is a grey powder that Dalton referred to as "the protoxide of tin", which is 88.1% tin and 11.9% oxygen. The other is a white powder which Dalton referred to as "the deutoxide of tin", which is 78.7% tin and 21.3% oxygen. Adjusting these figures, in the grey powder there is about 13.5 g of oxygen for every 100 g of tin, and in the white powder there is about 27 g of oxygen for every 100 g of tin. 13.5 and 27 form a ratio of 1:2. These compounds are known today as tin(II) oxide (SnO) and tin(IV) oxide (SnO_{2}). In Dalton's terminology, a "protoxide" is a molecule containing a single oxygen atom, and a "deutoxide" molecule has two. Tin oxides are actually crystals, they don't exist in molecular form.

Example 2 — iron oxides: Dalton identified two oxides of iron. There is one type of iron oxide that is a black powder which Dalton referred to as "the protoxide of iron", which is 78.1% iron and 21.9% oxygen. The other iron oxide is a red powder, which Dalton referred to as "the intermediate or red oxide of iron" which is 70.4% iron and 29.6% oxygen. Adjusting these figures, in the black powder there is about 28 g of oxygen for every 100 g of iron, and in the red powder there is about 42 g of oxygen for every 100 g of iron. 28 and 42 form a ratio of 2:3. These compounds are iron(II) oxide (Fe_{2}O_{2}) (Note: Iron(II) oxide's formula is written here as "Fe_{2}O_{2}" rather than the more conventional "FeO" because this better illustrates the explanation.) and iron(III) oxide (Fe_{2}O_{3}). Dalton described the "intermediate oxide" as being "2 atoms protoxide and 1 of oxygen", which adds up to two atoms of iron and three of oxygen. That averages to one and a half atoms of oxygen for every iron atom, putting it midway between a "protoxide" and a "deutoxide". As with tin oxides, iron oxides are crystals.

Example 3 — nitrogen oxides: Dalton was aware of three oxides of nitrogen: "nitrous oxide", "nitrous gas", and "nitric acid". These compounds are known today as nitrous oxide, nitric oxide, and nitrogen dioxide respectively. "Nitrous oxide" is 63.3% nitrogen and 36.7% oxygen, which means it has 80 g of oxygen for every 140 g of nitrogen. "Nitrous gas" is 44.05% nitrogen and 55.95% oxygen, which means there are 160 g of oxygen for every 140 g of nitrogen. "Nitric acid" is 29.5% nitrogen and 70.5% oxygen, which means it has 320 g of oxygen for every 140 g of nitrogen. 80 g, 160 g, and 320 g form a ratio of 1:2:4. The formulas for these compounds are N_{2}O, NO, and NO_{2}.

The earliest definition of Dalton's observation appears in an 1807 chemistry encyclopedia:

...where two bodies combine in different proportions, if the quantity of one of them be assumed as a fixed number, the proportions of the other body that unite to it are in the simplest possible ratio to each other, being produced by multiplying the lowest proportion by a simple integral number as 2, 3, 4, &c. [...] in all cases the simple elements of bodies are disposed to unite atom to atom singly; or if either is in excess, it exceeds by a ratio to be expressed by some simple multiple of the number of its atoms.

The first known writer to refer to this principle as the "doctrine of multiple proportions" was Jöns Jacob Berzelius in 1813.

Dalton's atomic theory garnered widespread interest but not universal acceptance shortly after he published it because the law of multiple proportions by itself was not complete proof of the existence of atoms. Over the course of the 19th century, other discoveries in the fields of chemistry and physics would give atomic theory more credence, such that by the end of the 19th century it had found universal acceptance.

== Bibliography ==
- Joseph Louis Proust (1800). "Recherches sur l'étain" [Research on tin]. Journal de Physique, de Chimie, et d'Histoire Naturelle (in French). 51: 173–184.
- Bertrand Pelletier (1792). "Observations sur plusieurs propriétés du Muriate d'Étain" [Observations on various properties of muriate of tin]. Annales de Chimie (in French). 12: 225–240.
- J. P. Millington (1906). John Dalton. J. M. Dent & Co. (London); E. P. Dutton & Co. (New York).
- Henry E. Roscoe; Arthur Harden (1896). A New View of the Origin of Dalton's Atomic Theory. Macmillan and Co.
