= Joseph Proust =

French chemist (1754–1826)

Joseph Louis Proust
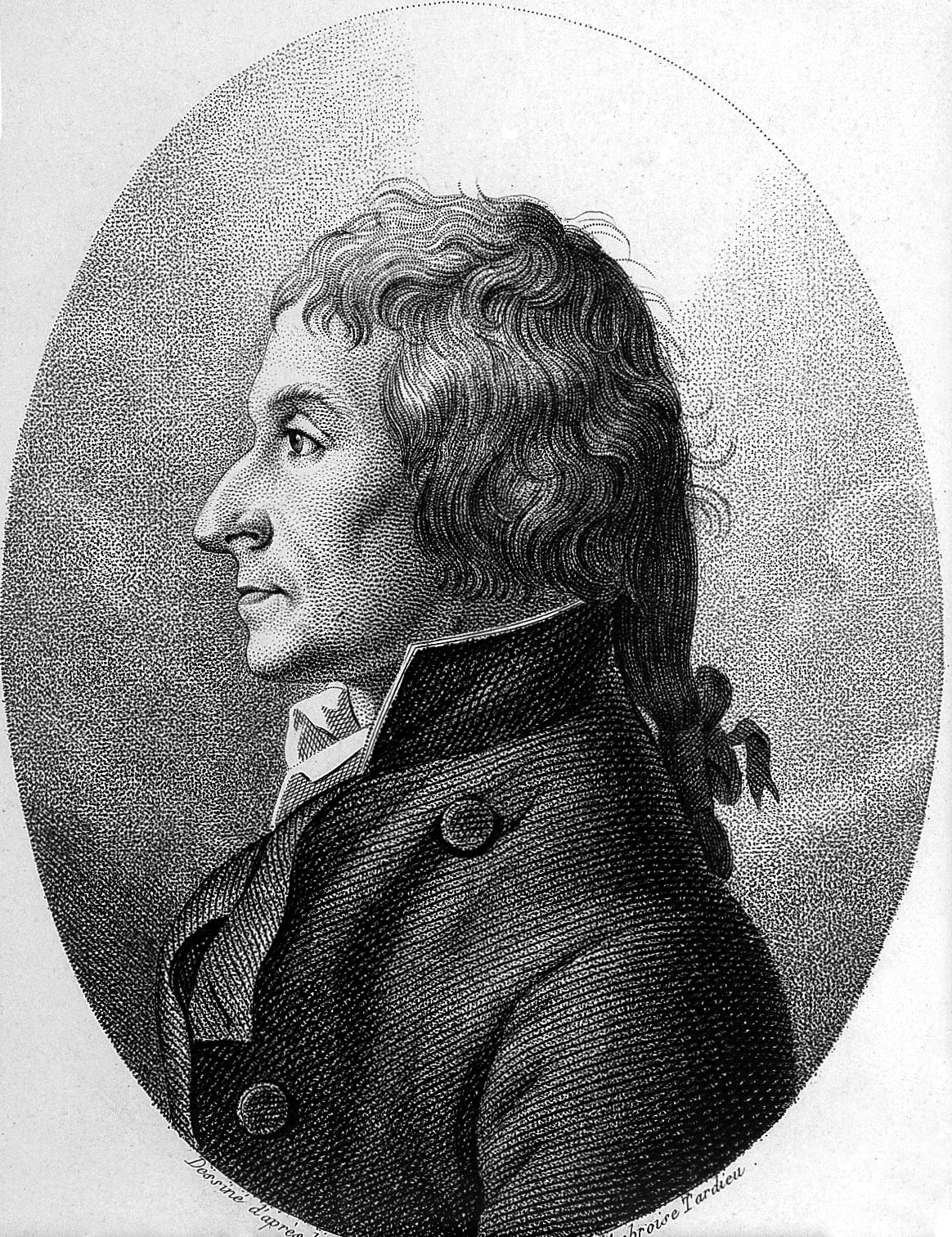
- Born: Joseph Louis Proust; 26 September 1754; Angers, France
- Died: 5 July 1826 (aged 71); Angers, France
- Occupation: Chemist

Joseph Louis Proust (French: [ʒozɛf pʁust]; 26 September 1754 – 5 July 1826) was a French chemist. He was best known for his discovery of the law of definite proportions in 1797, stating that elements always combine in constant proportions in chemical compounds .

== Life ==
Joseph-Louis Proust was born on 26 September 1754 in Angers, France. His father served as an apothecary in Angers. Joseph studied chemistry in his father's shop and later went to Paris where he gained the appointment of apothecary in chief to the Salpêtrière. He also taught chemistry with Pilâtre de Rozier, a famous aeronaut.

Under Carlos IV's influence Proust went to Spain. There he taught at the Chemistry School in Segovia and at the University of Salamanca. But when Napoleon invaded Spain, they burned Proust's laboratory and forced him back to France. On 5 July 1826 he died in Angers, France. The mineral proustite (Ag_{3}AsS_{3}) is named in his honour.

== Chemistry studies ==
Proust's largest accomplishment in the realm of science was disproving Berthollet with the law of definite proportions, which is sometimes also known as Proust's Law. Proust studied copper carbonate, the two tin oxides, and the two iron sulfides to prove this law. He did this by making artificial copper carbonate and comparing it to natural copper carbonate. With this he showed that each had the same proportion of weights between the three elements involved (Cu, C, O). Between the two types of the other compounds, Proust showed that no intermediate compounds exist between them. Proust published this paper in 1797, but the law was not accepted until 1812, when the Swedish chemist Jöns Jacob Berzelius gave him credit for it.

There are, however, exceptions to the Law of Definite Proportions. An entire class of substances does not follow this rule. The compounds are called non-stoichiometric compounds, or Berthollides, after Berthollet. The ratio of the elements present in the compound can fluctuate within certain limits, such as for example ferrous oxide. The ideal formula is FeO, but due to crystallographic vacancies it is reduced to about Fe_{0.95}O.

Proust was also interested in studying the sugars that are present in sweet vegetables and fruits. In 1799, Proust demonstrated, to his class in Madrid, how the sugar in grapes is identical to that found in honey.

== Works ==
- Joseph Louis Proust (1794 [i.e., 1797]) "Recherches sur le Bleu de Prusse" (https://gallica.bnf.fr/ark:/12148/bpt6k9604748r/f348.image) [Researches on Prussian blue] Journal de Physique, de Chimie, et d'Histoire Naturelle 45 334–341. This work was actually published in 1797, as can be seen from the article published in the same issue on page 314.
- Joseph Louis Proust (1798). "Analyse d'une Mine d'Argent d'Amérique" [Analysis of a silver mine in America]. Journal de Physique, de Chimie, et d'Histoire Naturelle (in French). 3: 389–391.
- Joseph Louis Proust (1799). "Sur la manganèse des cendres végétales" [On the manganese of vegetable ash]. Journal de Physique, de Chimie, et d'Histoire Naturelle (in French). 48: 469.
- Joseph Louis Proust (1800). "Recherches sur l'étain" [Research on tin]. Journal de Physique, de Chimie, et d'Histoire Naturelle (in French). 51: 173–184.
- Joseph Louis Proust (1801). "Faits détachés sur la platine" [Isolated facts on platinum]. Journal de Physique, de Chimie, et d'Histoire Naturelle (in French). 52: 409–438.
- Joseph Louis Proust (1801). "Mémoire sur les oeufs pétrifiés trouvés aux environs de Terruel en Arragon" [Memorandum on the petrified eggs found in the vicinity of Teruel in Aragon]. 53: 317–320.
- Joseph Louis Proust (1802). "Sur les sulfures natifs et artificiels du fer" [On the natural and artificial iron sulfides]. Journal de Physique, de Chimie, d'Histoire Naturelle, et des Arts (in French). 54: 89–96.
- Joseph Louis Proust (1803). "Sur le nickel" [On nickel]. Journal de Physique, de Chimie, d'Histoire Naturelle, et des Arts (in French). 57: 169–174.
- Joseph Louis Proust (1804). "Extrait d'une Lettre du Professeur Proust à J.-C. Delamétherie" [Excerpt of a Letter from Professor Proust to J-C Delamétherie]. Journal de Physique, de Chimie, d'Histoire Naturelle, et des Arts (in French). 59: 66.
- Joseph Louis Proust (1804). "Sur le bouillon d'os" [On bone broth]. Journal de Physique, de Chimie, d'Histoire Naturelle, et des Arts (in French). 59: 114–122.
- Joseph Louis Proust (1804). "Sur les sulfures métalliques" [On the metallic sulfurs]. Journal de Physique, de Chimie, d'Histoire Naturelle, et des Arts (in French). 59: 260–265.
- Joseph Louis Proust (1804). "Sur les sulfures alkalins" [On the alkaline sulfurs]. Journal de Physique, de Chimie, d'Histoire Naturelle, et des Arts (in French). 59: 265–273.
- Joseph Louis Proust (1804). "Sur les oxidations métalliques" [On metal oxides]. Journal de Physique, de Chimie, d'Histoire Naturelle, et des Arts (in French). 59: 321–342.
- Joseph Louis Proust (1804). "Sur le sulfate de cuivre, au minimum d'acide" [On copper sulfate, at the minimum of acid]. Journal de Physique, de Chimie, d'Histoire Naturelle, et des Arts (in French). 59: 343–350.
- Joseph Louis Proust (1804). "Sur les muriates de cuivre verd et blanc" [On the green and white muriates of copper]. Journal de Physique, de Chimie, d'Histoire Naturelle, et des Arts (in French). 59: 350–355.
- Joseph Louis Proust (1805). "Étain et muriate d'ammoniaque" [Tin and muriate of ammonia]. Journal de Physique, de Chimie, d'Histoire Naturelle, et des Arts (in French). 61: 338–349.
  - Translated to German in Journal für die Chemie und Physik vol. 1 (1806) p. 249-270
- Joseph Louis Proust (1806). "Sur l'utilité du Lichen d'Islande, comme aliment" [On the utility of Iceland lichen as a food]. Journal de Physique, de Chimie, d'Histoire Naturelle, et des Arts (in French). 63: 81–97.
- Joseph Louis Proust (1807). "Recherches sur les moyens de remplacer économiquement la corde à feu dans le service de l'Artillerie" [Research on feasible ways of replacing the fuse in use by the artillery]. Journal de Physique, de Chimie, d'Histoire Naturelle, et des Arts (in French). 64: 249–258.
- Joseph Louis Proust (1807). "Sur la blende" [On blende]. Journal de Physique, de Chimie, d'Histoire Naturelle, et des Arts (in French). 64: 150–154.
- Joseph Louis Proust (1807). "Des oxides de cuivre" [Some copper oxides]. Journal de Physique, de Chimie, d'Histoire Naturelle, et des Arts (in French). 65: 80–82.
- Joseph Louis Proust (1808). "Observations sur l'écrit de M Parmentier, inséré au Moniteur du 7 juin dernier, relatif aux moyens de remplacer le sucre dans la médecine et l'économie domestique" [Observations on the writings of Mr Parmentier, added to the Monitor on June 7, regarding the means of replacing sugar in medicine and domestic affairs]. Journal de Physique, de Chimie, d'Histoire Naturelle, et des Arts (in French). 67: 43–54.
