= Law of definite proportions =

Chemical law about ratio of substances in a compound

In chemistry, the law of definite proportions, sometimes called Proust's law or the law of constant composition, states that a given chemical compound contains its constituent elements in a fixed ratio (by mass) and does not depend on its source or method of preparation. For example, oxygen makes up about 8/9 of the mass of any sample of pure water, while hydrogen makes up the remaining 1/9 of the mass: the mass of two elements in a compound are always in the same ratio. Along with the law of multiple proportions, the law of definite proportions forms the basis of stoichiometry.

== History ==
The law of definite proportion was given by Joseph Proust in 1797.

I shall conclude by deducing from these experiments the principle I have established at the commencement of this memoir, viz. that iron, like many other metals, is subject to the law of nature which presides at every true combination, that is to say, that it unites with two constant proportions of oxygen. In this respect, it does not differ from tin, mercury, and lead, and, in a word, almost every known combustible.

— Joseph L. Proust, Recherches sur le bleu de Prusse, Journal de Physique...

At the end of the 18th century, when the concept of a chemical compound had not yet been fully developed, the law was novel. In fact, when first proposed, it was a controversial statement and was opposed by other chemists, most notably Proust's fellow Frenchman Claude Louis Berthollet, who argued that the elements could combine in any proportion. The existence of this debate demonstrates that, at the time, the distinction between pure chemical compounds and mixtures had not yet been fully developed.

The law of definite proportions contributed to the atomic theory that John Dalton promoted beginning in 1805, which explained matter as consisting of discrete atoms, that there was one type of atom for each element, and that the compounds were made of combinations of different types of atoms in fixed proportions.

A related early idea was Prout's hypothesis, formulated by English chemist William Prout, who proposed that the hydrogen atom was the fundamental atomic unit. From this hypothesis was derived the whole number rule, which was the rule of thumb that atomic masses were whole-number multiples of the mass of hydrogen. This was later rejected in the 1820s and 30s following more refined measurements of atomic mass, notably by Jöns Jacob Berzelius, which revealed in particular that the atomic mass of chlorine was 35.45, which was incompatible with the hypothesis. Since the 1920s, this discrepancy has been explained by the presence of isotopes; the atomic mass of any isotope is very close to satisfying the whole number rule, with the mass defect caused by differing binding energies being significantly smaller.

== Non-stoichiometric compounds and isotopes ==
Although very useful in the foundation of modern chemistry, the law of definite proportions is not universally true. There exist non-stoichiometric compounds whose elemental composition can vary from sample to sample. Such compounds follow the law of multiple proportions. An example is the iron oxide wüstite, which can contain between 0.83 and 0.95 iron atoms for every oxygen atom, and thus contain anywhere between 23% and 25% oxygen by mass. The ideal formula is FeO, but it is about Fe_{0.95}O due to crystallographic vacancies. In general, Proust's measurements were not precise enough to detect such variations.

In addition, the isotopic composition of an element can vary depending on its source, hence its contribution to the mass of even a pure stoichiometric compound may vary. This variation is used in radiometric dating since astronomical, atmospheric, oceanic, crustal and deep Earth processes may concentrate some environmental isotopes preferentially. Except for hydrogen and its isotopes, the effect is usually small, but is measurable with modern-day instrumentation.

Many natural polymers vary in composition (for instance DNA, proteins, carbohydrates) even when "pure". Polymers are generally not considered "pure chemical compounds" except when their molecular weight is uniform (mono-disperse) and their stoichiometry is constant.
