= Saha ionization equation =

Relation between the ionization state of a gas and the temperature and pressure

In physics, the Saha ionization equation is an expression that relates the ionization state of a gas in thermal equilibrium to the temperature and pressure. The equation is a result of combining ideas of quantum mechanics and statistical mechanics and is used to explain the spectral classification of stars. The expression was developed by physicist Meghnad Saha in 1920. It is discussed in many textbooks on statistical physics and plasma physics.

== Description ==
For a gas at a high enough temperature (here measured in energy units, i.e. keV or J) and/or density, the thermal collisions of the atoms will ionize some of the atoms, making an ionized gas. When several or more of the electrons that are normally bound to the atom in orbits around the atomic nucleus are freed, they form an independent electron gas cloud co-existing with the surrounding gas of atomic ions and neutral atoms. With sufficient ionization, the gas can become the state of matter called plasma.

The Saha equation describes the degree of ionization for any gas in thermal equilibrium as a function of the temperature, density, and ionization energies of the atoms.

For a gas composed of a single atomic species, the Saha equation is written:
$$\frac{n_{i+1}n_\text{e}}{n_i} = \frac{2}{\lambda_\text{th}^{3}} \frac{g_{i+1}}{g_i} \exp\left[-\frac{\varepsilon_{i+1}-\varepsilon_i}{k_\text{B} T}\right]$$
where:

- $n_i$ is the number density of atoms in the i-th state of ionization, that is with i electrons removed.
- $g_i$ is the degeneracy of state for the i-ions.
- $\varepsilon_i$ is the energy required to remove i electrons from a neutral atom, creating an i-level ion.
- $n_\text{e}$ is the electron density
- $k_\text{B}$ is the Boltzmann constant
- $\lambda_\text{th}$ is the thermal de Broglie wavelength of an electron
  $$\lambda_\text{th} \ \stackrel{\mathrm{def}}{=}\   \frac{h}{\sqrt{2\pi m_\text{e} k_\text{B} T}}$$
- $m_\text{e}$ is the mass of an electron
- $T$ is the temperature of the gas
- $h$ is the Planck constant

The expression $(\varepsilon_{i+1}-\varepsilon_i)$ is the energy required to ionize the species from state $i$ to state $i+1$.

In the case where only one level of ionization is important, we have $n_1=n_\text{e}$ for H^{+}; defining the total density H/H^{+} as $n=n_0+n_1,$ the Saha equation simplifies to:
$$\frac{n_\text{e}^2}{n-n_\text{e}} = \frac{2}{\lambda_\text{th}^3}\frac{g_1}{g_0}\exp\left[\frac{-\varepsilon}{k_\text{B} T}\right]$$
where $\varepsilon$ is the energy of ionization. We can define the degree of ionization $x=n_1/n$ and find
$$\frac{x^2}{1-x}=A= \frac{2}{n\lambda_\text{th}^3}\frac{g_1}{g_0}\exp\left[\frac{-\varepsilon}{k_\text{B} T}\right]$$
This gives a quadratic equation that can be solved (in closed form):
$$x^2+Ax-A=0, x=(A\sqrt{(1+\tfrac{4}{A})}-A)/2$$
For small $A(T),$ low temperature, $x\approx A^{1/2},\propto n^{-1/2},$ so that the ionization decreases with higher number density (factors 10 in both plots).

Note that, except for weakly ionized plasmas, the plasma environment affects the atomic structure with the subsequent lowering of the ionization potentials and the "cutoff" of the partition function. Therefore, $\varepsilon_i$ and $g_i$ depend, in general, on $T$ and $n_\text{e}$ and solving the Saha equation is only possible iteratively.

Range in temperature equals 0.2 ε/k_{B} and is 0.30 of T scale below. Calculated ionization x_{H/e} in chromosphere or at ICP conditions?

As a simple example, imagine a gas of monatomic hydrogen, set $g_0=g_1$ and let $\varepsilon$ = 13.6 eV (158000 K), the ionization energy of hydrogen from its ground state. Let $n$ = 2.69×10^{25} m^{−3}, which is the Loschmidt constant (n_{L} for N_{A}), or particle density of Earth's atmosphere at standard pressure and temperature. At $T$ = 300 K, the ionization is essentially none: $x$ = 5×10^{−115} and there would almost certainly be no ionized atoms in the volume of Earth's atmosphere. But $x$ increases rapidly with $T$, reaching 0.35 for $T$ = 20000 K. There is substantial ionization even though this $k_BT$ is much less than the ionization energy (although this depends somewhat on density). This is a common occurrence. Physically, it stems from the fact that at a given temperature, the particles have a distribution of energies, including some with several times $k_BT.$ These high-energy particles are much more effective at ionizing atoms.

In Earth's atmosphere, ionization is actually governed not by the Saha equation but by very energetic cosmic rays, largely of muons. These particles are not in thermal equilibrium with the atmosphere, so they are not at its temperature and the Saha logic does not apply.

Ionization of hydrogen from the Saha equation vs. temperature for 3 total ion number densities (relative to the Loschmidt constant $n_0=p_{atm}/(k_BT_{std})$).

Rigorously, the Saha equation is only valid for dilute gases, due to the underlying ideal gas assumption used in its derivation. For dense gases, this assumption is no longer valid, because particle interactions becoming significant modify the chemical potential of the species. And the compressibility of ionized gas and plasma. Hence, the Saha ionization framework has been extended to deal with systems that are denser than the ideal gas limit p/RT [mole/m^{3}], by incorporating corrections for these non-ideal interactions into the thermodynamic potential. This correction leads to improved estimates for the degree of ionization in the corona of the Sun.

== Particle densities ==
The Saha equation is useful for determining the ratio of particle densities for two different ionization levels. The most useful form of the Saha equation for this purpose is
$$\frac{Z_i}{N_i} = \frac{Z_{i+1}Z_e}{N_{i+1}N_e},$$
where Z denotes the partition function of atom/ion resp. electron. The Saha equation can be seen as a restatement of the equilibrium condition for the chemical potentials:
$$\mu_i = \mu_{i+1} + \mu_e\,$$

This equation simply states that the potential for an atom of ionization state i to ionize is the same as the potential for an electron and an atom of ionization state i + 1. The potentials are equal; therefore, the system is in equilibrium, and no net change of ionization will occur.

== Stellar atmospheres ==
In the early nineteen-twenties, Ralph H. Fowler (in collaboration with Charles Galton Darwin) developed a new method in statistical mechanics permitting a systematic calculation of the equilibrium properties of matter. He used this to provide a rigorous derivation of the ionization formula which Saha had obtained, by extending to the ionization of atoms the theorem of Jacobus Henricus van 't Hoff, used in physical chemistry for its application to molecular dissociation. Also, a significant improvement in the Saha equation introduced by Fowler was to include the effect of the excited states of atoms and ions. A further important step forward came in 1923, when Edward Arthur Milne and R.H. Fowler published a paper in the Monthly Notices of the Royal Astronomical Society, showing that the criterion of the maximum intensity of absorption lines (belonging to subordinate series of a neutral atom) was much more fruitful in giving information about physical parameters of stellar atmospheres than the criterion employed by Saha, which consisted in the marginal appearance or disappearance of absorption lines. The latter criterion requires some knowledge of the relevant pressures in the stellar atmospheres, and Saha, following the generally accepted view at the time, assumed a value of the order of 1 to 0.1 atmosphere. Milne wrote:

Saha had concentrated on the marginal appearances and disappearances of absorption lines in the stellar sequence, assuming an order of magnitude for the pressure in a stellar atmosphere and calculating the temperature where increasing ionization, for example, inhibited further absorption of the line in question owing to the loss of the series electron. As Fowler and I were one day stamping round my rooms in Trinity and discussing this, it suddenly occurred to me that the maximum intensity of the Balmer lines of hydrogen, for example, was readily explained by the consideration that at the lower temperatures there were too few excited atoms to give appreciable absorption, whilst at the higher temperatures there are too few neutral atoms left to give any absorption. ... That evening I did a hasty order of magnitude calculation of the effect and found that to agree with a temperature of 10000° [K] for the stars of type A0, where the Balmer lines have their maximum, a pressure of the order of 10^{−4} atmosphere was required. This was very exciting, because standard determinations of pressures in stellar atmospheres from line shifts and line widths had been supposed to indicate a pressure of the order of one atmosphere or more, and I had begun on other grounds to disbelieve this.

The generally accepted view at the time assumed that the composition of stars was similar to Earth. However, in 1925 Cecilia Payne used Saha's ionization theory to calculate that the composition of stellar atmospheres is as we now know it; mostly hydrogen and helium, expanding the knowledge of stars.

== Stellar coronae ==
Saha equilibrium prevails when the plasma is in local thermodynamic equilibrium, which is not the case in the optically thin corona. Here, the equilibrium ionization states must be estimated by detailed statistical calculations of collision and recombination rates.

== Early universe ==
Equilibrium ionization, described by the Saha equation, explains evolution in the early universe. After the Big Bang, all atoms were ionized, leaving mostly protons and electrons (looking in the past). According to Saha's approach, when the universe had expanded and cooled such that the temperature reached about 3000 K, electrons (re)combined with protons (10 fm) forming hydrogen atoms (0.1 nm). At this point, 700 millennia later, when it was 100 million K, the universe became transparent to most electromagnetic radiation. That 3000 K surface, red-shifted in time by a factor of about 1,000, generated the 2.7 K cosmic microwave background radiation, which pervades the universe today.
