= Historical definitions of the SI base units =

Since its introduction in 1960, the base units for the International system of units, known as SI, have changed several times. Tables in this article summarize those changes.

== Background for the tables ==
When Maxwell first introduced the concept of a coherent system, he identified three quantities that could be used as base units: mass, length, and time. Giorgi later identified the need for an electrical base unit, for which the unit of electric current was chosen for SI. Another three base units (for temperature, amount of substance, and luminous intensity) were added later.

The early metric systems defined a unit of weight as a base unit, while the SI defines an analogous unit of mass. In everyday use, these are mostly interchangeable, but in scientific contexts the difference matters. Mass, strictly the inertial mass, represents a quantity of matter. It relates the acceleration of a body to the applied force via Newton's law, F = m × a: force equals mass times acceleration. A force of 1 N (newton) applied to a mass of 1 kg will accelerate it at 1 m/s^{2}. This is true whether the object is floating in space or in a gravity field e.g. at the Earth's surface. Weight is the force exerted on a body by a gravitational field, and hence its weight depends on the strength of the gravitational field. Weight of a 1 kg mass at the Earth's surface is m × g; mass times the acceleration due to gravity, which is 9.81 newtons at the Earth's surface and is about 3.5 newtons at the surface of Mars. Since the acceleration due to gravity is local and varies by location and altitude on the Earth, weight is unsuitable for precision measurements of a property of a body, and this makes a unit of weight unsuitable as a base unit.

Since 1960 the CGPM has made a number of changes to the SI to meet the needs of specific fields, notably chemistry and radiometry. These are mostly additions to the list of named derived units, and include the mole (symbol mol) for an amount of substance, the pascal (symbol Pa) for pressure, the siemens (symbol S) for electrical conductance, the becquerel (symbol Bq) for "activity referred to a radionuclide", the gray (symbol Gy) for ionising radiation, the sievert (symbol Sv) as the unit of dose equivalent radiation, and the katal (symbol kat) for catalytic activity.

The range of defined prefixes pico- (10^{−12}) to tera- (10^{12}) was extended to quecto- (10^{−30}) to quetta- (10^{30}).

The 1960 definition of the standard metre in terms of wavelengths of a specific emission of the krypton-86 atom was replaced in 1983 with the distance that light travels in vacuum in exactly 1/299792458 second, so that the speed of light is now an exactly specified constant of nature.

A few changes to notation conventions have also been made to alleviate lexicographic ambiguities. An analysis under the aegis of CSIRO, published in 2009 by the Royal Society, has pointed out the opportunities to finish the realisation of that goal, to the point of universal zero-ambiguity machine readability.

Evolution of the SI base units
Unit name	Definition (Note: Interim definitions are given here only when there has been a significant difference in the definition.)
second	Prior (1675): 1/86400 of a day of 24 hours of 60 minutes of 60 seconds.^{TLB}; Interim (1956): 1/31556925.9747 of the tropical year for 1900 January 0 at 12 hours ephemeris time.; Current (1967): The duration of 9192631770 periods of the radiation corresponding to the transition between the two hyperfine levels of the ground state of the caesium-133 atom.
metre	Prior (1793): 1/10000000 of the meridian through Paris between the North Pole and the Equator.^{FG}; Interim (1889): The prototype of the metre chosen by the CIPM, at the temperature of melting ice, represents the metric unit of length.; Interim (1960): 1650763.73 wavelengths in vacuum of the radiation corresponding to the transition between the 2p^{10} and 5d^{5} quantum levels of the krypton-86 atom.; Current (1983): The distance travelled by light in vacuum in 1/299792458 second.
kilogram	Prior (1793): The grave was defined as being the mass (then called weight) of one litre of pure water at its freezing point.^{FG}; Interim (1889): The mass of a small squat cylinder of ≈47 cubic centimetres of platinum-iridium alloy kept in the International Bureau of Weights and Measures (BIPM), Pavillon de Breteuil, France. (Note: It is known as the International Prototype of the Kilogram.) Also, in practice, any of numerous official replicas of it.; Current (2019): The kilogram is defined by setting the Planck constant h exactly to 6.62607015×10^{−34} J⋅s (J = kg⋅m^{2}⋅s^{−2}), given the definitions of the metre and the second. Then the formula would be kg = h/(6.62607015×10^{−34}⋅m^{2}⋅s^{−1})
ampere	Prior (1881): A tenth of the electromagnetic CGS unit of current. The [CGS] electromagnetic unit of current is that current, flowing in an arc 1 cm long of a circle 1 cm in radius, that creates a field of one oersted at the centre. ^{IEC}; Interim (1946): The constant current which, if maintained in two straight parallel conductors of infinite length, of negligible circular cross-section, and placed 1 m apart in vacuum, would produce between these conductors a force equal to 2×10^{−7} newtons per metre of length.; Current (2019): The flow of 1/(1.602176634×10^{−19}) times the elementary charge e per second.
kelvin	Prior (1743): The centigrade scale is obtained by assigning 0 °C to the freezing point of water and 100 °C to the boiling point of water.; Interim (1954): The triple point of water (0.01 °C) defined to be exactly 273.16 K. (Note: In 1954 the unit of thermodynamic temperature was known as the "degree Kelvin" (symbol °K; "Kelvin" spelt with an upper-case "K"). It was renamed the "kelvin" (symbol "K"; "kelvin" spelt with a lower case "k") in 1967.); Previous (1967): 1/273.16 of the thermodynamic temperature of the triple point of water.; Current (2019): The kelvin is defined by setting the fixed numerical value of the Boltzmann constant k to 1.380649×10^{−23} J⋅K^{−1}, (J = kg⋅m^{2}⋅s^{−2}), given the definition of the kilogram, the metre, and the second.
mole	Prior (1900): A stoichiometric quantity which is the equivalent mass in grams of the Avogadro number of molecules of a substance.^{ICAW}; Interim (1967): The amount of substance of a system which contains as many elementary entities as there are atoms in 0.012 kilogram of carbon-12.; Current (2019): The amount of substance of exactly 6.02214076×10^{23} elementary entities. This number is the fixed numerical value of the Avogadro constant, N_{A}, when expressed in the unit mol^{−1} and is called the Avogadro number.
candela	Prior (1946): The value of the new candle (early name for the candela) is such that the brightness of the full radiator at the temperature of solidification of platinum is 60 new candles per square centimetre.; Current (1979): The luminous intensity, in a given direction, of a source that emits monochromatic radiation of frequency 5.4×10^{14} hertz and that has a radiant intensity in that direction of 1/683 watt per steradian.; Note: both old and new definitions are approximately the luminous intensity of a spermaceti candle burning modestly bright, in the late 19th century called a "candlepower" or a "candle".
Notes The Prior definitions of the various base units in the above table were made by the following authors and authorities: TLB = Tito Livio Burattini, Misura universale, Vilnius, 1675; FG = French Government; IEC = International Electrotechnical Commission; ICAW = International Committee on Atomic Weights; All other definitions result from resolutions by either CGPM or the CIPM and are catalogued in the SI Brochure.

== 2005 ==
Prior to the 2019 revision of the SI, from 2005 to early 2019, the SI base units were defined as follows.

Historical SI base units
Name	Symbol	Measure	Pre-2019 (2005) formal definition	Historical origin / justification	Dimension symbol
metre	m	length	"The metre is the length of the path travelled by light in vacuum during a time interval of 1 / 299792458 of a second." 17th CGPM (1983, Resolution 1, CR, 97)	1 / 10000000 of the distance from the Earth's equator to the North Pole measured on the circumference through Paris.	L
kilogram	kg	mass	"The kilogram is the unit of mass; it is equal to the mass of the international prototype of the kilogram." 3rd CGPM (1901, CR, 70)	The mass of one litre of water at the temperature of melting ice. A litre is one thousandth of a cubic metre.	M
second	s	time	"The second is the duration of 9192631770 periods of the radiation corresponding to the transition between the two hyperfine levels of the ground state of the caesium 133 atom." 13th CGPM (1967/68, Resolution 1; CR, 103) "This definition refers to a caesium atom at rest at a temperature of 0 K." (Added by CIPM in 1997)	The day is divided in 24 hours, each hour divided in 60 minutes, each minute divided in 60 seconds. A second is 1 / (24 × 60 × 60) of the day.	T
ampere	A	electric current	"The ampere is that constant current which, if maintained in two straight parallel conductors of infinite length, of negligible circular cross-section, and placed 1 metre apart in vacuum, would produce between these conductors a force equal to 2×10^{−7} newton per metre of length." 9th CGPM (1948)	The original "Absolute Ampere" was defined as 0.1 Electromagnetic units. The original "International Ampere" was defined electrochemically as the current required to deposit 1.118 milligrams of silver per second from a solution of silver nitrate. Compared to the SI ampere, the difference is 0.015%.	I
kelvin	K	thermodynamic temperature	"The kelvin, unit of thermodynamic temperature, is the fraction 1 / 273.16 of the thermodynamic temperature of the triple point of water." 13th CGPM (1967/68, Resolution 4; CR, 104) "This definition refers to water having the isotopic composition defined exactly by the following amount of substance ratios: 0.000 155 76 mole of ^{2}H per mole of ^{1}H, 0.000 379 9 mole of ^{17}O per mole of ^{16}O, and 0.002 005 2 mole of ^{18}O per mole of ^{16}O." (Added by CIPM in 2005)	The Celsius scale: the Kelvin scale uses the degree Celsius for its unit increment, but is a thermodynamic scale (0 K is absolute zero).	Θ
mole	mol	amount of substance	"1. The mole is the amount of substance of a system which contains as many elementary entities as there are atoms in 0.012 kilogram of carbon 12; its symbol is 'mol'.: 2. When the mole is used, the elementary entities must be specified and may be atoms, molecules, ions, electrons, other particles, or specified groups of such particles." 14th CGPM (1971, Resolution 3; CR, 78); "In this definition, it is understood that unbound atoms of carbon 12, at rest and in their ground state, are referred to." (Added by CIPM in 1980)	Atomic weight or molecular weight divided by the molar mass constant, 1 g/mol.	N
candela	cd	luminous intensity	"The candela is the luminous intensity, in a given direction, of a source that emits monochromatic radiation of frequency 540×10^{12} hertz and that has a radiant intensity in that direction of 1 / 683 watt per steradian." 16th CGPM (1979, Resolution 3; CR, 100)	The candlepower, which is based on the light emitted from a burning candle of standard properties.	J
Name	Symbol	Measure	Pre-2019 (2005) formal definition	Historical origin / justification	Dimension symbol
