= Coulomb =

SI derived unit of electric charge

coulomb
- Diagram showing 1 coulomb (electric charge carried by a current of 1 ampere during 1 second) and the equivalent number of electrons

General information
- Unit system: SI
- Unit of: electric charge
- Symbol: C
- Named after: Charles-Augustin de Coulomb

Conversions
1 C in ...	... is equal to ...
- SI base units: A⋅s
- CGS units: ≘ 2997924580 statC
- Atomic units: ≈ 6.241509×10^{18} e

The coulomb (symbol: C) is the unit of electric charge in the International System of Units (SI). It is defined to be equal to the electric charge delivered by a 1 ampere current in 1 second, with the elementary charge e as a defining constant in the SI.

== Definition ==
The SI defines the coulomb as "the quantity of electricity carried in 1 second by a current of 1 ampere" by fixing the value of the elementary charge, e = 1.602176634×10^{−19} C. Inverting the relationship, the coulomb can be expressed in terms of the elementary charge:
$$1 ~ \mathrm{C} = \frac{e}{1.602\,176\,634 \times 10^{-19}}
\approx 6.241509\times 10^{18} ~ e .$$

The approximation can be extended to any number of digits. It is not an integer multiple of the elementary charge.

The coulomb was previously defined in terms of the ampere based on the force between two wires, as 1 A × 1 s. The 2019 redefinition of the ampere and other SI base units fixed the numerical value of the elementary charge when expressed in coulombs and therefore fixed the value of the coulomb when expressed as a multiple of the fundamental charge.

== SI prefixes ==
Like other SI units, the coulomb can be modified by adding a prefix that multiplies it by a power of 10.

SI multiples of coulomb (C)
Submultiples			Multiples		
Value	SI symbol	Name	Value	SI symbol	Name
10^{−1} C	dC	decicoulomb	10^{1} C	daC	decacoulomb
10^{−2} C	cC	centicoulomb	10^{2} C	hC	hectocoulomb
10^{−3} C	**mC**	**millicoulomb**	10^{3} C	kC	kilocoulomb
10^{−6} C	**μC**	**microcoulomb**	10^{6} C	MC	megacoulomb
10^{−9} C	**nC**	**nanocoulomb**	10^{9} C	GC	gigacoulomb
10^{−12} C	**pC**	**picocoulomb**	10^{12} C	TC	teracoulomb
10^{−15} C	fC	femtocoulomb	10^{15} C	PC	petacoulomb
10^{−18} C	aC	attocoulomb	10^{18} C	EC	exacoulomb
10^{−21} C	zC	zeptocoulomb	10^{21} C	ZC	zettacoulomb
10^{−24} C	yC	yoctocoulomb	10^{24} C	YC	yottacoulomb
10^{−27} C	rC	rontocoulomb	10^{27} C	RC	ronnacoulomb
10^{−30} C	qC	quectocoulomb	10^{30} C	QC	quettacoulomb
Common multiples are in bold face.

== Conversions ==
- The magnitude of the electrical charge of one mole of elementary charges (approximately 6.022×10^{23}, the Avogadro number) is known as a faraday unit of charge (closely related to the Faraday constant). One faraday equals 9.648533212...×10^{4} coulombs. In terms of the Avogadro constant (N_{A}), one coulomb is equal to approximately 1.036×10^{−5} mol × N_{A} elementary charges.
- Every farad of capacitance can hold one coulomb per volt across the capacitor.
- One ampere hour equals 3600 C, hence 1 mA⋅h = 3.6 C.
- One statcoulomb (statC), the obsolete CGS electrostatic unit of charge (esu), is approximately 3.3356×10^{−10} C or about one-third of a nanocoulomb.

== In everyday terms ==
- The charges in static electricity from rubbing materials together are typically a few microcoulombs.
- The amount of charge that travels through a lightning bolt is typically around 15 C, although for large bolts this can be up to 350 C.
- The amount of charge that travels through a typical alkaline AA battery from being fully charged to discharged is about 5 kC = 5000 C ≈ 1400 mA⋅h.
- A typical smartphone battery can hold 10800 C ≈ 3000 mA⋅h.

== Name and history ==
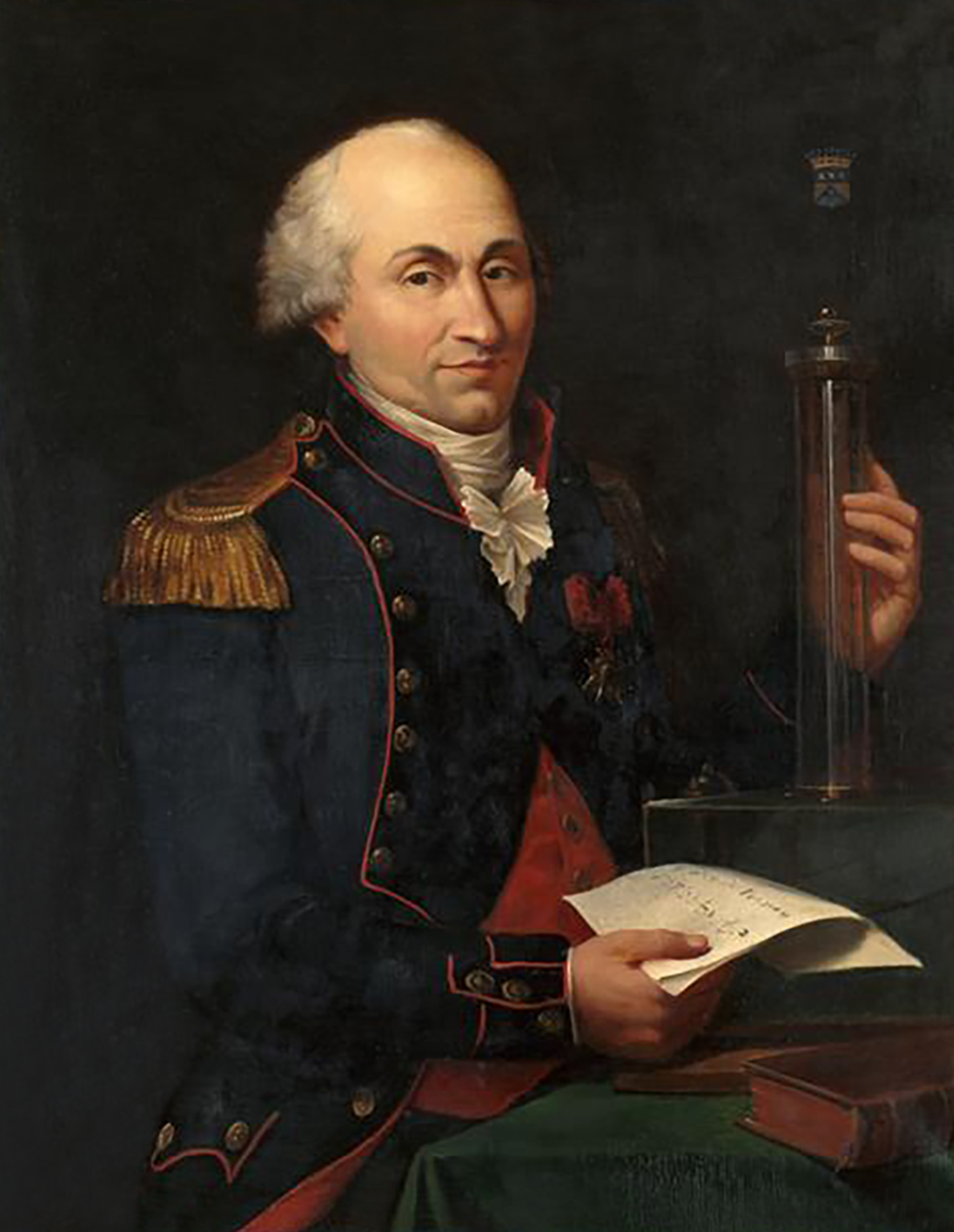
Charles-Augustin de Coulomb

The coulomb is named after Charles-Augustin de Coulomb. As with every SI unit named after a person, its symbol starts with an upper case letter (C), but when written in full, it follows the rules for capitalisation of a common noun; i.e., coulomb becomes capitalised at the beginning of a sentence and in titles but is otherwise in lower case.

By 1878, the British Association for the Advancement of Science had defined the volt, ohm, and farad, but not the coulomb. In 1881, the International Electrical Congress, now the International Electrotechnical Commission (IEC), approved the volt as the unit for electromotive force, the ampere as the unit for electric current, and the coulomb as the unit of electric charge. At that time, the volt was defined as the potential difference [i.e., what is nowadays called the "voltage (difference)"] across a conductor when a current of one ampere dissipates one watt of power. The coulomb (later "absolute coulomb" or "abcoulomb" for disambiguation) was part of the EMU system of units. The "international coulomb" based on laboratory specifications for its measurement was introduced by the IEC in 1908. The entire set of "reproducible units" was abandoned in 1948 and the "international coulomb" became the modern coulomb.

== See also ==
- Abcoulomb, a cgs unit of charge
- Ampère's circuital law
- Coulomb's law
- Electrostatics
- Elementary charge
- Faraday constant, the number of coulombs per mole of elementary charges
