= Amagat =

Unit of volumetric number density

An amagat (denoted amg or Am) is a practical unit of volumetric number density. Although it can be applied to any substance at any conditions, it is defined as the number of ideal gas molecules per unit volume at 1 atm (101.325 kPa) and 0 °C (273.15 K). It is named after Émile Amagat, who also has Amagat's law named after him.

== SI conversion ==
The amg unit for number density can be converted to the SI unit of moles per cubic meter (mol/m^{3}) by the formula
$$1\ \text{amg } \overset{\frown}{=} \ \frac{n_0}{N_A} \approx 44.615 \text{ mol/m}^3,$$
where

≘ indicates correspondence, since the SI unit is of molar concentration and not number density;
n_{0} is the Loschmidt constant;
N_{A} is the Avogadro constant.

In cgs units, one amagat in units of (number of particles) per cubic centimeter is:
$$1\ \text{amg } \overset{\frown}{=} 2.69\times10^{19}/\text{cm}^3,$$

The number density of an ideal gas at absolute pressure p and absolute temperature T can be calculated as
$$\eta = \frac{p}{p_0} \ \frac{T_0}{T} \ \text{ amg},$$
where T_{0} = 273.15 K, and p_{0} = 101.325 kPa (STP before 1982).

== Example ==
Number density of an ideal gas (such as air) at room temperature (20 °C) and 1 atm (101.325 kPa) is

$$\eta = \left(\frac{1\ \text{atm}}{p_0}\right) \left(\frac{273.15\ \text{K}}{(273.15 + 20)\ \text{K}}\right)\ \text{amg} = 0.932\ \text{amg}.$$
