= Amedeo Avogadro =

Italian scientist (1776–1856)

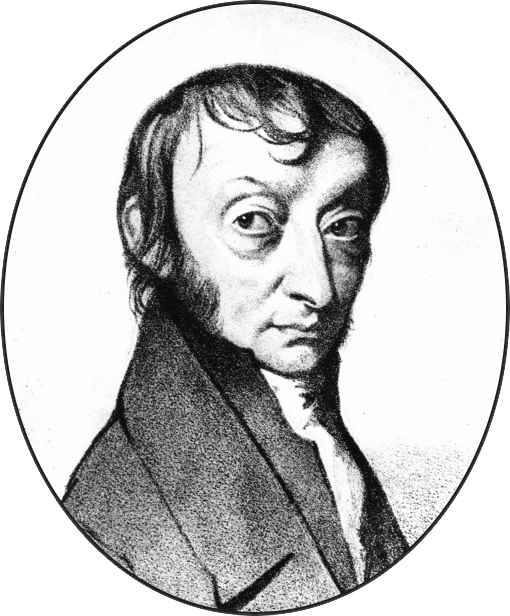
- Born: Lorenzo Romano Amedeo Carlo Avogadro; 9 August 1776; Turin, Kingdom of Sardinia
- Died: 9 July 1856 (aged 79); Turin, Piedmont-Sardinia
- Known for: Avogadro's law Avogadro constant
- Scientific career
- Fields: Chemistry
- Workplaces: University of Turin

Lorenzo Romano Amedeo Carlo Avogadro, Count of Quaregna and Cerreto (/ˌævəˈɡɑːdroʊ/, also US: /ˌɑːv-/, Italian: [ameˈdɛːo avoˈɡaːdro]; 9 August 1776 – 9 July 1856) was an Italian scientist, most noted for his contribution to molecular theory now known as Avogadro's law, which states that equal volumes of gases under the same conditions of temperature and pressure will contain equal numbers of molecules. In tribute to him, the ratio of the number of elementary entities (atoms, molecules, ions or other particles) in a substance to its amount of substance (the latter having the unit mole), 6.02214076×10^{23} mol^{−1}, is known as the Avogadro constant. This constant is denoted N_{A}, and is one of the seven defining constants of the SI.

== Biography ==
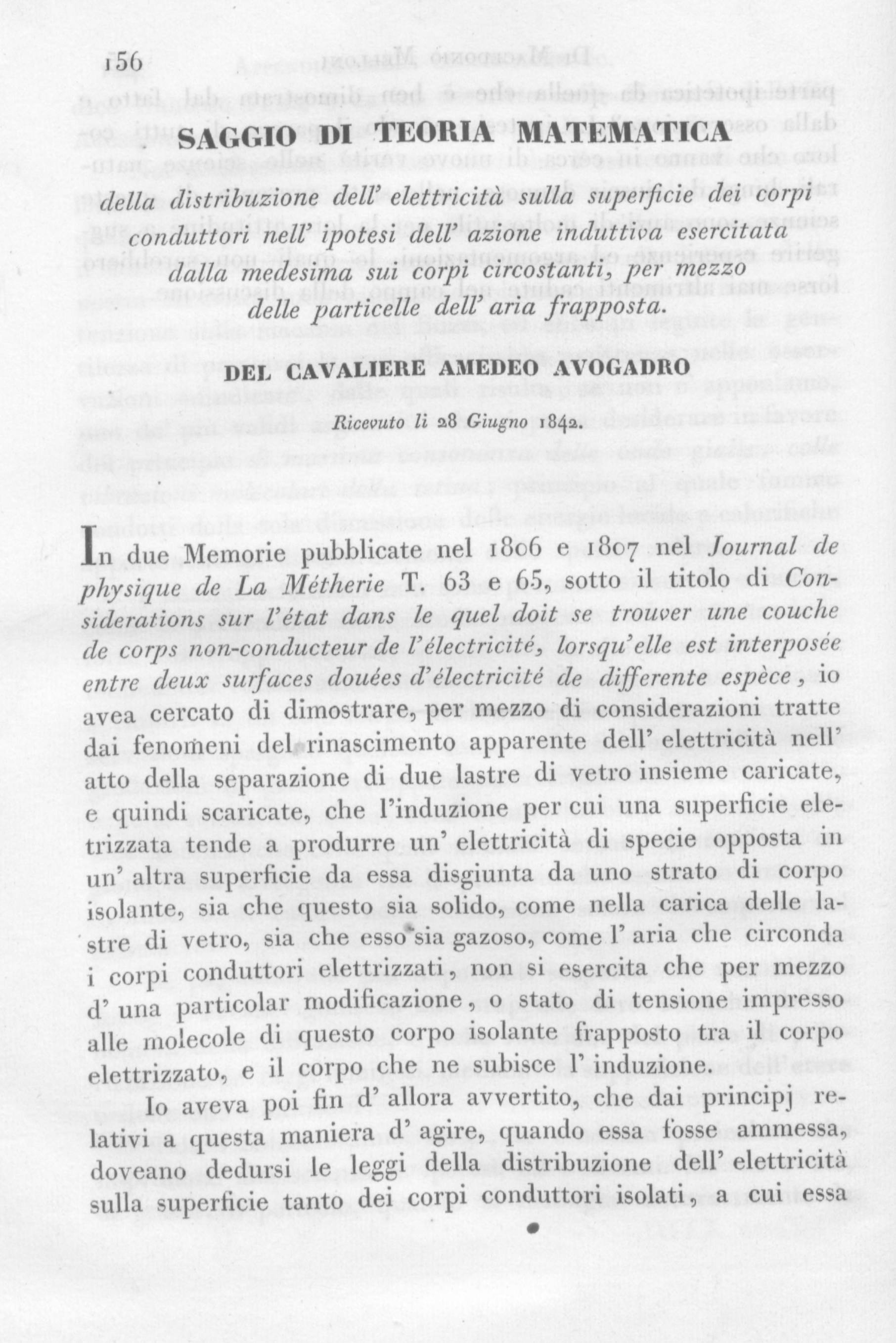
Essay on the mathematical theory of the distribution of electricity on the surface of conducting bodies, 1844

Amedeo Avogadro was born in Turin to a noble family of the Kingdom of Sardinia in the year 1776. His father, Count Filippo Avogadro, was a lawyer and magistrate in Piedmont. He graduated in ecclesiastical law at the late age of 20 and began to practice. Soon after, he dedicated himself to physics and mathematics (then called positive philosophy), and in 1809 started teaching them at a liceo (high school) in Vercelli, where his family lived and had some property.

In 1811, he published an article with the title Essai d'une manière de déterminer les masses relatives des molécules élémentaires des corps, et les proportions selon lesquelles elles entrent dans ces combinaisons ("Essay on a manner of Determining the Relative Masses of the Elementary Molecules of Bodies and the Proportions by Which They Enter These Combinations"), which contains Avogadro's hypothesis. Avogadro submitted this essay to Jean-Claude Delamétherie's Journal de Physique, de Chimie et d'Histoire naturelle ("Journal of Physics, Chemistry and Natural History").

In 1820, he became a professor of physics at the University of Turin. Turin was now the capital of the restored Savoyard Kingdom of Sardinia under Victor Emmanuel I. Avogadro was active in the revolutionary movement of March 1821. As a result, he lost his chair in 1823 (or, as the university officially declared, it was "very glad to allow this interesting scientist to take a rest from heavy teaching duties, in order to be able to give better attention to his researches"). Eventually, King Charles Albert granted a Constitution (Statuto Albertino) in 1848. Well before this, Avogadro had been recalled to the university in Turin in 1833, where he taught for another twenty years.

Little is known about Avogadro's private life, which appears to have been sober and religious. He married Felicita Mazzé and had six children. Avogadro held posts dealing with statistics, meteorology, and weights and measures (he introduced the metric system into Piedmont) and was a member of the Royal Superior Council on Public Instruction.

He died on 9 July 1856.

== Accomplishments ==
In honour of Avogadro's contributions to molecular theory, the number of molecules per mole of a substance is named the Avogadro constant, N_{A}. It is exactly 6.02214076×10^{23} mol^{−1}. The Avogadro constant is used to compute the results of chemical reactions. It allows chemists to determine the amounts of substances produced in a given reaction to a great degree of accuracy.

Johann Josef Loschmidt first calculated the value of the Avogadro constant, the number of particles in one mole, sometimes referred to as the Loschmidt number in German-speaking countries (Loschmidt constant now has another meaning).

Avogadro's law states that the relationship between the masses of the same volume of all gases (at the same temperature and pressure) corresponds to the relationship between their respective molecular weights. Hence, the relative molecular mass of a gas can be calculated from the mass of a sample of known volume.

Avogadro developed this hypothesis after Joseph Louis Gay-Lussac published his law on volumes (and combining gases) in 1808. The greatest problem Avogadro had to resolve was the confusion at that time regarding atoms and molecules. One of his most important contributions was clearly distinguishing one from the other, stating that gases are composed of molecules, and these molecules are composed of atoms. (For instance, John Dalton did not consider this possibility.) Avogadro did not actually use the word "atom", as the words "atom" and "molecule" were used almost without difference. He believed that there were three kinds of "molecules", including an "elementary molecule" (our "atom"). Also, he gave more attention to the definition of mass, as distinguished from weight.

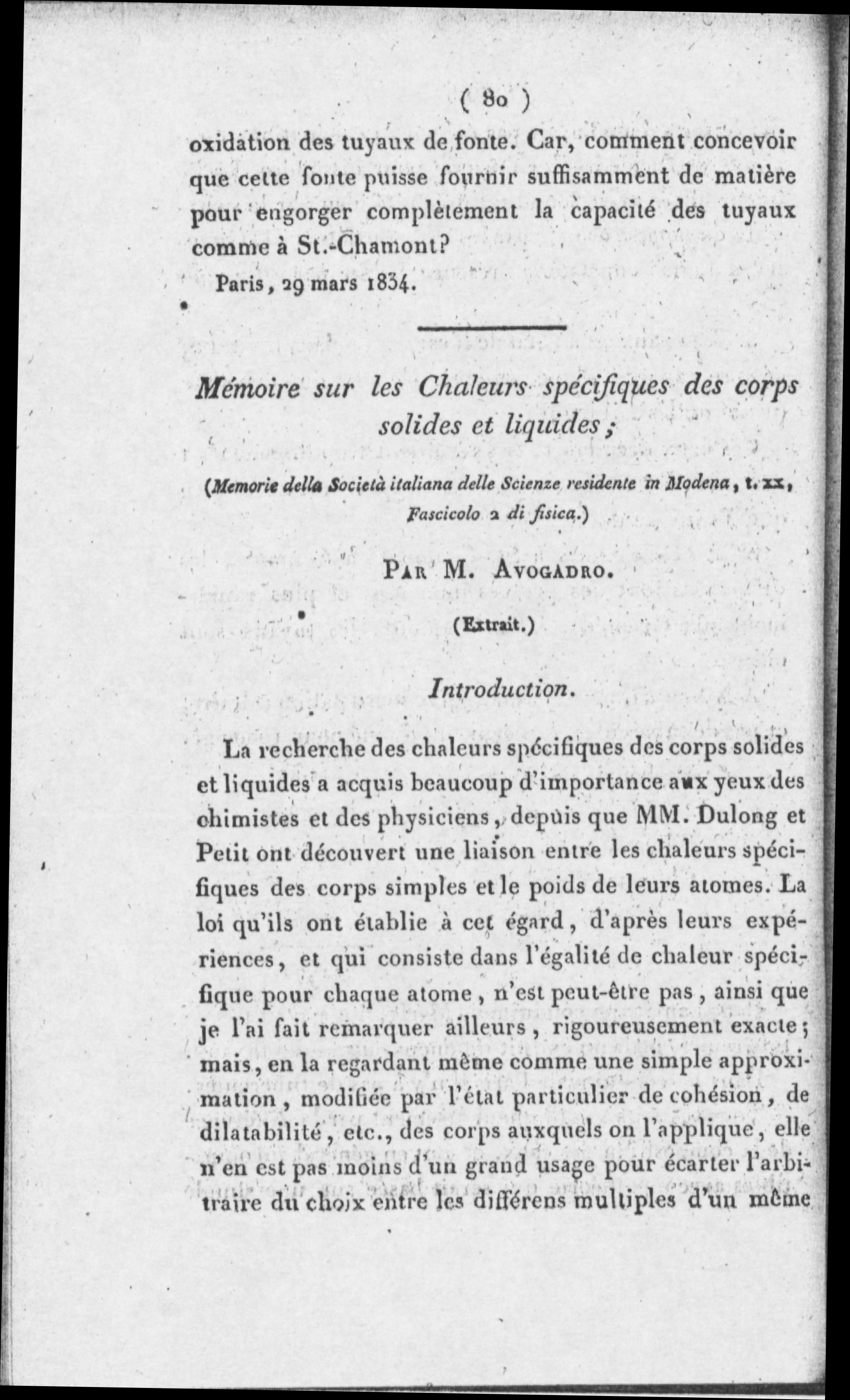
Mémoire

In 1815, he published Mémoire sur les masses relatives des molécules des corps simples, ou densités présumées de leur gaz, et sur la constitution de quelques-uns de leur composés, pour servir de suite à l'Essai sur le même sujet, publié dans le Journal de Physique, juillet 1811 ("Note on the Relative Masses of Elementary Molecules, or Suggested Densities of Their Gases, and on the Constituents of Some of Their Compounds, As a Follow-up to the Essay on the Same Subject, Published in the Journal of Physics, July 1811") about gas densities.

In 1821 he published another paper, Nouvelles considérations sur la théorie des proportions déterminées dans les combinaisons, et sur la détermination des masses des molécules des corps (New Considerations on the Theory of Proportions Determined in Combinations, and on Determination of the Masses of Atoms) and shortly afterwards, Mémoire sur la manière de ramener les composès organiques aux lois ordinaires des proportions déterminées ("Note on the Manner of Finding the Organic Composition by the Ordinary Laws of Determined Proportions").

In 1841, he published his work in Fisica dei corpi ponderabili, ossia Trattato della costituzione materiale de' corpi, 4 volumes.

== Response to the theory ==
The scientific community did not give great attention to Avogadro's theory, and it was not immediately accepted. André-Marie Ampère proposed a very similar theory three years later (in his Sur la détermination des proportions dans lesquelles les corps se combinent d'après le nombre et la disposition respective des molécules dont leurs particules intégrantes sont composées; "On the Determination of Proportions in which Bodies Combine According to the Number and the Respective Disposition of the Molecules by Which Their Integral Particles Are Made"), but the same indifference was shown to his theory as well.

Only through studies by Charles Frédéric Gerhardt and Auguste Laurent on organic chemistry was it possible to demonstrate that Avogadro's law explained why the same quantities of molecules in a gas have the same volume.

Unfortunately, related experiments with some inorganic substances showed seeming contradictions. This was finally resolved by Stanislao Cannizzaro, as announced at Karlsruhe Congress in 1860, four years after Avogadro's death. He explained that these exceptions were due to molecular dissociations at certain temperatures, and that Avogadro's law determined not only molecular masses but atomic masses as well.

In 1911, a meeting in Turin commemorated the hundredth anniversary of the publication of Avogadro's classic 1811 paper. King Victor Emmanuel III attended, and Avogadro's great contribution to chemistry was recognised.

Rudolf Clausius, with his kinetic theory on gases proposed in 1857, provided further evidence for Avogadro's law. Jacobus Henricus van 't Hoff showed that Avogadro's theory also held in dilute solutions.

Avogadro is hailed as a founder of the atomic-molecular theory.

== See also ==
- Avogadrite (mineral)
- Avogadro – far side lunar crater named after him in 1970
