= Number density =

Degree of concentration of countable objects

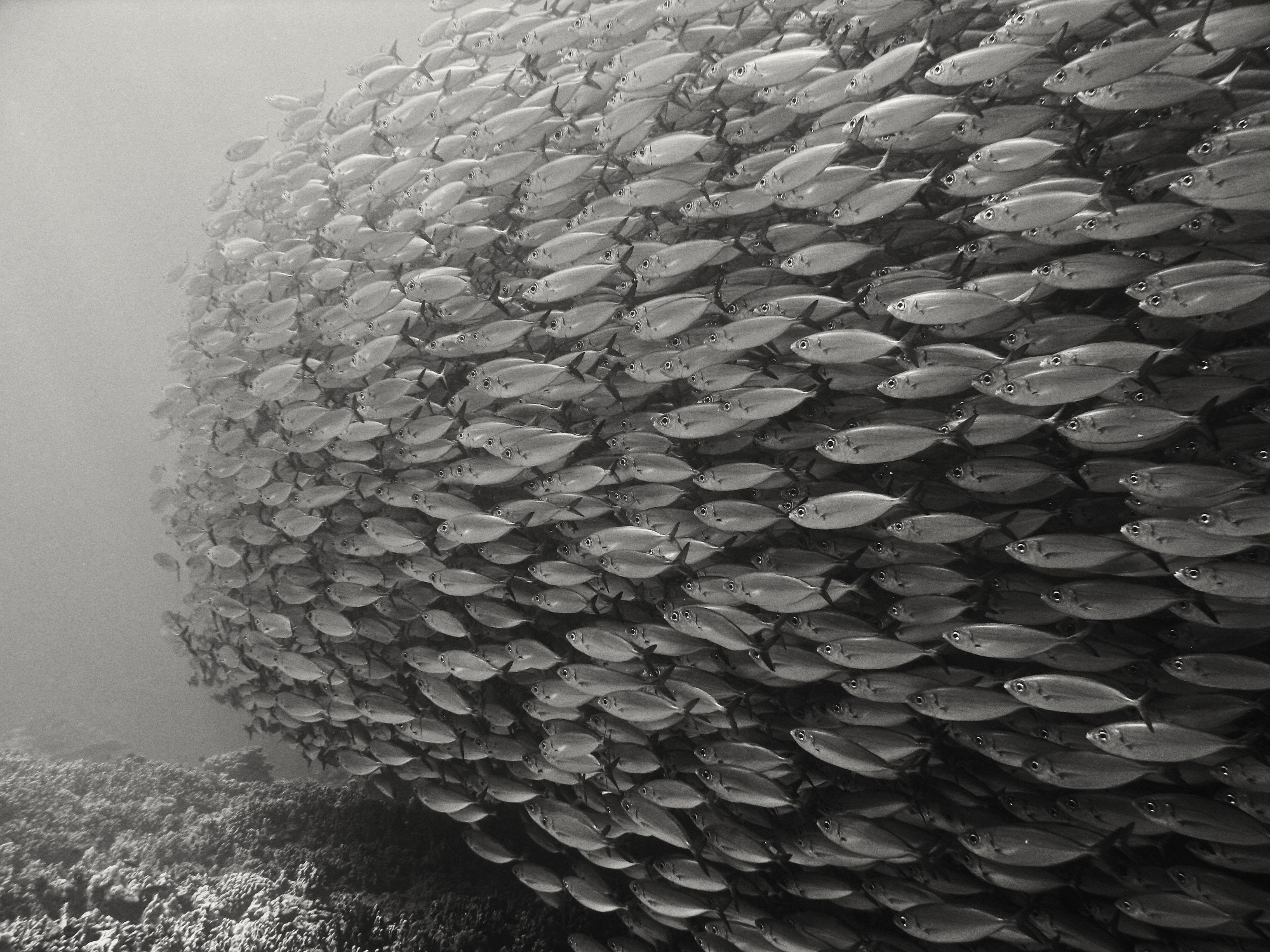
Dense school of Big Eyed Scad (selar crumenophthalmus) in Kona, Hawaii

The number density (symbol: n or ρ_{N}) is an intensive quantity used to describe the degree of concentration of countable objects (particles, molecules, phonons, cells, galaxies, etc.) in physical space: three-dimensional volumetric number density, two-dimensional areal number density, or one-dimensional linear number density. Population density is an example of areal number density. The term number concentration (symbol: lowercase n, or C, to avoid confusion with amount of substance indicated by uppercase N) is sometimes used in chemistry for the same quantity, particularly when comparing with other concentrations.

== Definition ==
Volume number density is the number of specified objects per unit volume:
$$n = \frac{N}{V},$$
where N is the total number of objects in a volume V.

Here it is assumed that N is large enough that rounding of the count to the nearest integer does not introduce much of an error, but V is chosen to be small enough that the resulting n does not depend much on the size or shape of the volume V because of large-scale features.

Area number density is the number of specified objects per unit area, A:
$$n' = \frac{N}{A},$$
Similarly, linear number density is the number of specified objects per unit length, L:
$$n'' = \frac{N}{L},$$

Column number density is a kind of areal density, the number or count of a substance per unit area, obtained integrating volumetric number density along a vertical path:
$$n'_c = \int n \, \mathrm{d}\ell.$$
It's related to column mass density, with the volumetric number density replaced by the volume mass density.

== Units ==
In SI units, number density is measured in m^{−3}, although cm^{−3} is often used. However, these units are not quite practical when dealing with atoms or molecules of gases, liquids or solids at room temperature and atmospheric pressure, because the resulting numbers are extremely large (on the order of 10^{20}). Using the number density of an ideal gas at 0 °C and 1 atm as a yardstick: n_{0} = 1 amg = 2.6867774 × 10^{25} m^{−3} is often introduced to define a relative number density (a dimensionless quantity), for any substances at any conditions (not necessarily limited to an ideal gas at 0 °C and 1 atm).

== Usage ==
Using the number density as a function of spatial coordinates, the total number of objects N in the entire volume V can be calculated as
$$N = \iiint_V n(x,\,y,\,z)\,\mathrm{d}V,$$
where dV = dx dy dz is a volume element. If each object possesses the same mass m_{0}, the total mass m of all the objects in the volume V can be expressed as
$$m = \iiint_V m_0 n(x,\,y,\,z)\,\mathrm{d}V.$$

Similar expressions are valid for electric charge or any other extensive quantity associated with countable objects. For example, replacing m with q (total charge) and m_{0} with q_{0} (charge of each object) in the above equation will lead to a correct expression for charge.

The number density of solute molecules in a solvent is sometimes called concentration, although usually concentration is expressed as a number of moles per unit volume (and thus called molar concentration).

== Relation to other quantities ==
=== Molar concentration ===
For any substance, the number density can be expressed in terms of its amount concentration c (in mol/m^{3}) as
$$n = N_{\rm A}c$$
where N_{A} is the Avogadro constant. This is still true if the spatial dimension unit, metre, in both n and c is consistently replaced by any other spatial dimension unit, e.g. if n is in cm^{−3} and c is in mol/cm^{3}, or if n is in L^{−1} and c is in mol/L, etc.

=== Mass density ===
For atoms or molecules of a well-defined molar mass M (in kg/mol), the number density can sometimes be expressed in terms of their mass density ρ_{m} (in kg/m^{3}) as
$$n = \frac{N_{\rm A}}{M} \rho_\mathrm{m}.$$
Note that the ratio M/N_{A} is the mass of a single atom or molecule in kg.

== Examples ==
The following table lists common examples of number densities at 1 atm and 20 °C, unless otherwise noted.

Molecular number density and related parameters of some materials
Material	Number density, n		Amount concentration, c	Mass density, ρ_{m}	Molar mass, M
Material	(10^{27} m^{−3} = 10^{21} cm^{−3})	(amg)	(10^{3} mol/m^{3} = mol/L)	(10^{3} kg/m^{3} = g/cm^{3})	(10^{−3} kg/mol = g/mol)
Ideal gas	0.02504	0.932	0.04158	41.58 × 10^{−6} M	M
Dry air	0.02504	0.932	0.04158	1.2041 × 10^{−3}	28.9644
Water	33.3679	1,241.93	55.4086	0.99820	18.01524
Diamond	176.2	6,556	292.5	3.513	12.01
