= Mercè Crosas =

Spanish researcher (born 1966)

- Born: Mercè Crosas Navarro; 1966 (age 59–60); Barcelona
- Occupation: researcher
- Known for: open data expert

Mercè Crosas (born 1966, Barcelona) is a researcher and technologist specializing in data science, data management, and open data. Since November 2023 she is President of CODATA, the Committee on Data of the International Science Council. Crosas is the Director of Computational Social Sciences and Humanities at the Barcelona Supercomputing Center.

== Biography ==
Crosas holds a degree in physics from the University of Barcelona (1989) and a PhD in astrophysics from Rice University (Houston, Texas, 1992), with predoctoral and postdoctoral stays at the Harvard-Smithsonian Center for Astrophysics. She has spent most of her professional life at Harvard University, first as an astrophysicist and research software engineer at the Harvard-Smithsonian Center for Astrophysics and later as Director of Data Science and Technology at the Institute for Quantitative Social Sciences, from Harvard University and as Chief Research Data Management Officer at Harvard University. From 2000 to 2004, she worked outside of Harvard at a pair of biotech startups leading software development teams to build their research data systems.

During her time at Harvard University, Crosas worked closely with research, computing services, and libraries to direct the management and publication of research data and provide guidance on University policies, processes, and tools for support the data life cycle. Crosas has extensive experience in data systems architecture and international data standards, with the vision of making them more accessible while ensuring their privacy. From 2006 to 2021, she co-led the Dataverse project and its open source community. The Dataverse software project has been used successfully to share and publish data at universities and research organizations around the world.

She was also co-principal investigator (co-PI) of the OpenDP project, an open source set of differential privacy tools for analyzing sensitive private data, and of the NIH Data Commons Consortium.

Crosas has been a member of numerous international committees and working groups focused on open data, data management and analysis, and data sharing. She is co-author of the internationally recognized and used FAIR data principles and has contributed to the recommendations of the Organization for Economic Cooperation and Development (OECD) for access to public data.

Between 2021 and 2022 she was the Secretary of Open Government of the Catalan Government. Since 2023, she has led the Computational Social Sciences Program at the Barcelona Supercomputing Center.

In November 2023 she was appointed President of CODATA.
