= Dataverse =

Open source web application for interacting with research data

- Original author: Harvard University
- Written in: Java
- Platform: Java
- License: Apache License 2.0
- Website: dataverse.org
- Repository: github.com/IQSS/dataverse

The Dataverse Project is an open source web application to share, preserve, cite, explore and analyze research data. Researchers, data authors, publishers, data distributors, and affiliated institutions all receive appropriate credit via a data citation with a persistent identifier (e.g., DOI, or handle).

A Dataverse repository is the software installation, within which there can be collections (sometimes alternatively called dataverses) and dataset(s). Each collection can itself contain datasets or other collections, and each dataset contains descriptive metadata and data files (including documentation and code that accompany the data).

In 2019, Dataverse won the Duke's Choice Award for university and higher education.

== Background ==
The Dataverse Project is housed and developed by the Dataverse Team at the Institute for Quantitative Social Science (IQSS) at Harvard University. Coding of the Dataverse (previously known as Dataverse Network) software began in 2006 under the leadership of Mercè Crosas and Gary King. The earlier Virtual Data Center (VDC) project, which spanned 1999-2006, was organized by Micah Altman, Gary King, and Sidney Verba as a collaboration between the Harvard-MIT Data Center (now part of IQSS) and the Harvard University Library. Precursors to the VDC date to 1987, comprising such entities as a stand-alone software guide to local data, preweb software, and tools to transfer cataloging information by FTP to other sites across campus automatically at designated times.

== Installations ==
There are currently 150 known Dataverse installations around the world.

=== Harvard Dataverse ===
A collaboration with the Institute for Quantitative Social Science (IQSS), the Harvard Library, and Harvard University Information Technology (HUIT): the Harvard Dataverse is a repository for sharing, citing, analyzing, and preserving research data. It is considered a generalist repository in being open to data from all disciplines worldwide and can be utilized by researchers regardless of affiliation, unlike most other Dataverse installations that are restricted to affiliates of given organizations.

=== Dataverse in Europe ===
Dataverse is also utilized by research organizations in Europe; currently, there are active installations in Austria, Belgium, Croatia, Czechia, Denmark, Estonia, France, Germany, Iceland, Ireland, Italy, Hungary, Latvia, Lithuania, Luxembourg, Netherlands, Norway, Poland, Portugal, Russia, Slovenia, Spain, and Ukraine. The largest European-based Dataverse repository is called DataverseNL and located in the Netherlands providing data management services for more than 20 Dutch institutions and organizations. A similar service is established in Norway (cf. DataverseNO).

=== Dataverse in North America ===
In Canada, Borealis is a national instance of the Dataverse repository hosted by OCUL's Scholars Portal at the University of Toronto. Borealis allows institutions to offer a Dataverse service without operating and maintaining the software themselves. Most academic institutions offering a Dataverse service in Canada subscribe to the Borealis service. The associated community of practice is organized through the Digital Research Alliance of Canada's Network of Experts via the Dataverse North Expert Group, a coordination, collaboration and communication instance.

In the United States and Mexico, Dataverse installations are typically associated with a single institution or a group of institutions, mainly universities. Examples include the UNC Dataverse (UNC Chapel Hill), the Texas Data Repository (Texas Digital Library), and the Yale Dataverse (Yale University). The Qualitative Data Repository is a Dataverse installation hosted by Syracuse University but is open to researchers of any affiliation.

=== Dataverse in Latin America ===
There are active Dataverse installations in Argentina, Brazil, Chile, Colombia, Costa Rica, Ecuador, Peru, and Uruguay. Some of these are designed for specific institutions (e.g., Repositorio de datos de investigación de la Universidad de Chile) while others are at the national level (e.g., Papyrus, Ministerio de las Culturas, las Artes y Los Saberes in Colombia). SciELO Data is an installation for data associated with forthcoming or existing SciELO publications and preprints.

=== Other Dataverse installations ===
Dataverse installations are also operated in Australia, Botswana, Hong Kong, India, Indonesia, Kenya, Lebanon, Singapore, and Taiwan.

== APIs and interoperability ==
The Dataverse currently has multiple open APIs available, which allow for searching, depositing and accessing data.

== Alternatives and similar projects ==
Dataverse is often compared to other open-source repository software, some of which is specific to data repositories (e.g., invenioRDM) and some of which is more general-use (e.g., DSpace). CKAN provides similar functions and is widely used for open data. Harvard Dataverse is typically compared against similar large-scale generalist repositories that are open to research data from across disciplines and to researchers regardless of affiliation; these include Dryad, figshare, Mendeley Data, Open Science Framework, and Zenodo. These repositories are involved in a National Institutes of Health-funded "coopetition" initiative (the Generalist Repository Ecosystem Initiative [GREI]).

== See also ==
- Data citation
- Data sharing
