= Molar mass constant =

Physical constant in chemistry

The molar mass constant, usually denoted as M_{u}, is a physical constant defined as 1/12 of the molar mass of carbon-12: M_{u} = M(^{12}C)/12 ≈ 1 g/mol, where M(^{12}C) ≈ 12 g/mol. The molar mass of a substance (element or compound) is its relative atomic mass (atomic weight) or relative molecular mass (molecular weight or formula weight) multiplied by the molar mass constant.

The mole and the dalton (unified atomic mass unit) were originally defined in the International System of Units (SI) in such a way that the constant was exactly 1 g/mol, which made the numerical value of the molar mass of a substance, in grams per mole, equal to the average mass of its constituent particles (atoms, molecules, or formula units) relative to the atomic mass constant, m_{u} = m(^{12}C)/12 = 1 Da, where m(^{12}C) = 12 Da. Thus, for example, the average molecular mass of water is approximately 18.0153 daltons, making the mass of one mole of water approximately 18.0153 grams.

On 20 May 2019, the SI definition of the mole changed in such a way that the molar mass constant remains very close to 1 g/mol (for all practical purposes) but is no longer exactly equal to it. According to the SI, the value of M_{u} now depends on the mass of a carbon-12 atom in grams, which must be determined experimentally. The CODATA recommended value of the molar mass constant is:

M_{u} = 1.00000000105(31)×10^{−3} kg⋅mol^{−1}.

This is equal to [1 + (1.05 ± 0.31) × 10^{−9}] g/mol, with a relative deviation of about a part per billion from the former defined value, which is larger than its uncertainty but still small enough to be negligible for practical purposes.

The molar mass constant is important in writing dimensionally correct equations. While one may informally say "the molar mass M(X) of an element X is equal to its relative atomic mass expressed in grams per mole", the relative atomic mass A_{r}(X) is a dimensionless quantity, whereas the molar mass has the SI coherent unit of kg/mol but is usually given in g/mol or kg/kmol (both equal to 0.001 kg/mol). Formally, M(X) is A_{r}(X) times the molar mass constant M_{u}: M(X) = A_{r}(X) M_{u}.

== Prior to 2019 revision ==
The molar mass constant was unusual (but not unique) among physical constants by having an exactly defined value rather than being measured experimentally. From the old definition of the mole, the molar mass of carbon-12, M(^{12}C), was exactly 12 g/mol. From the definition of relative atomic mass, the relative atomic mass of carbon-12, A_{r}(^{12}C), is exactly 12. The molar mass constant was thus given by:

$$M_{\text{u}} = \frac{M(^{12}\text{C})}{A_{\text{r}}(^{12}\text{C})} = \frac{12\text{ g/mol}}{12} = 1\text{ g/mol}$$

The molar mass constant M_{u} was related to the mass of a carbon-12 atom, m(^{12}C), in grams:

$$m({}^{12}{\text{C}}) = 12\,m_\text{u} = \frac{12\,M_{\text{u}}}{N_{\text{A}}} = \frac{12 \text{ g/mol}}{N_{\text{A}}}$$

While the molar mass constant had a fixed value, the value of the atomic mass of carbon-12 in grams (and thus the value of the dalton in grams) was dependent on the accuracy and precision of the Avogadro constant.

== Post-2019 revision ==
Because the 2019 revision of the SI redefined the mole and gave the Avogadro constant N_{A} an exact numerical value when expressed in terms of the mole, the value of the molar mass constant is no longer fixed. The molar mass constant M_{u} is now dependent on the experimentally determined atomic mass of carbon-12, m(^{12}C), in grams:

$$M_\text{u} = m_\text{u} N_\text{A} = \frac{m(^{12}\text{C})}{12} \times N_\text{A}$$

One consequence of this change is that the previously defined relationship between the mass of the ^{12}C atom, the dalton, the kilogram, and the Avogadro number is no longer exact. One of the following had to change:

- The mass of a ^{12}C atom is exactly 12 daltons.
- The number of daltons in a gram is exactly equal to the Avogadro number: i.e., N_{A} = (g/Da) mol^{−1}.

The wording of the 9th SI Brochure (Note: A footnote in Table 8 on non-SI units states: "The dalton (Da) and the unified atomic mass unit (u) are alternative names (and symbols) for the same unit, equal to 1/12 of the mass of a free carbon 12 atom, at rest and in its ground state.") implies that the first statement remains valid, which means the second is no longer exactly true. The molar mass constant is still very close to 1 g/mol, but no longer exactly equal to it. Appendix 2 to the 9th SI Brochure states that "the molar mass of carbon 12, M(^{12}C), is equal to 0.012 kg⋅mol^{−1} within a relative standard uncertainty equal to that of the recommended value of N_{A}h at the time this Resolution was adopted, namely 4.5×10^{−10}, and that in the future its value will be determined experimentally", which makes no reference to the dalton and is consistent with either statement.

For a substance X consisting of N(X) entities, molar mass, M(X), is the ratio of substance mass, m(X), and substance amount, n(X): M(X) = m(X)/n(X). Substance mass is an aggregate of N(X) atomic-scale entity masses: m(X) = N(X)m_{a}(X). Substance amount is an aggregate of N(X) atomic-scale entities: n(X) = N(X)n_{a}, where n_{a} is an elementary amount (independent of the substance) consisting of exactly one entity (equal to the reciprocal of the Avogadro constant). In terms of the atomic-scale mass unit, the dalton, m_{a}(X) = A_{r}(X) Da. In terms of the atomic-scale unit for amount of substance, the entity, n_{a} = 1 ent. So molar mass is M(X) = m_{a}(X)/n_{a}, the entity mass per entity, which is self-evident. And this can be written M(X) = A_{r}(X) Da/ent = A_{r}(X)M_{u}, where the molar mass constant is exactly one dalton per entity, and this is not affected by the 2019 base unit redefinitions. Before the redefinition of the mole, one dalton per entity was exactly equal to one gram per mole. Although the dalton per entity is no longer exactly equal to one gram per mole, for all practical purposes in stoichiometry, we can write: Da/ent = g/mol = kg/kmol, relating atomic-scale and macroscopic units for molar mass.

== See also ==
- Dalton
