= Element–reactant–product table =

An element–reaction–product table is used to find coefficients while balancing an equation representing a chemical reaction. Coefficients represent moles of a substance so that the number of atoms produced is equal to the number of atoms being reacted with.

This is the common setup:

- Element: all the elements that are in the reaction equation.
- Reactant: the numbers of each of the elements on the reactants side of the reaction equation.
- Product: the number of each element on the product side of the reaction equation.

The layout should eventually look like this, for a balanced reaction of baking soda and vinegar:

HC_{2}H_{3}O_{2} + NaHCO_{3} → NaC_{2}H_{3}O_{2} + H_{2}CO_{3}

Element	Moles of reactants	Moles of products
Hydrogen	5	5
Carbon	3	3
Oxygen	5	5
Sodium	1	1

From this, since the number of reactants for each element equals the number of products for each element, we can tell that each side is balanced in the equation.

== Balancing ==
When a reaction equation is not balanced, the coefficients show inequality. Here is an example with the separation of natural gas from hydrochloric acid using magnesium.

Mg + HCl → MgCl_{2} + H_{2} (unbalanced)

Here is the element-reaction-product table:

Element	Moles of reactants	Moles of products
Hydrogen	1	2
Chlorine	1	2
Magnesium	1	1

From this table we see that the number of hydrogen and chlorine atoms on the product's side are twice the number of atoms on the reactant's side. Therefore, we add the coefficient "2" in front of the HCl on the products side, to get the equation to look like this:

Mg + 2 HCl → MgCl_{2} + H_{2}

and the table reflects that change:

Element	Moles of reactants	Moles of products
Hydrogen	~~1~~ 2	2
Chlorine	~~1~~ 2	2
Magnesium	1	1

Because of the coefficients, the equation is balanced.
