= Mole map (chemistry) =

Graphical representation of an algorithm

In chemistry, a mole map is a graphical representation of an algorithm that compares molar mass, number of particles per mole, and factors from balanced equations or other formulae. They are often used in undergraduate-level chemistry courses as a tool to teach the basics of stoichiometry and unit conversion.
