= Molar mass =

Mass per amount of substance

Molar masses
- A diagram comparing moles and molar masses of iron and gold samples that have equal masses
- Common symbols: M
- SI unit: kg/mol
- Other units: g/mol
- Dimension: M N^{−1}

In chemistry, the molar mass (M) (sometimes called molecular weight or formula weight, but see related quantities for usage) of a chemical substance (element or compound) is defined as the ratio between the mass (m) and the amount of substance (n, measured in moles) of any sample of the substance: M = m/n. The molar mass is a bulk, not molecular, property of a substance. The molar mass is a weighted average of many instances of the element or compound, which often vary in mass due to the presence of isotopes. Most commonly, the molar mass is computed from the standard atomic weights and is thus a terrestrial average and a function of the relative abundance of the isotopes of the constituent atoms on Earth.

The molecular mass (for molecular compounds) and formula mass (for non-molecular compounds, such as ionic salts) are commonly used as synonyms of molar mass, as the numerical values are identical (for all practical purposes), differing only in units (dalton vs. g/mol or kg/kmol). However, the most authoritative sources define it differently. The difference is that molecular mass is the mass of one specific particle or molecule (a microscopic quantity), while the molar mass is an average over many particles or molecules (a macroscopic quantity).

The molar mass is an intensive property of the substance, that does not depend on the size of the sample. In the International System of Units (SI), the coherent unit of molar mass is kg/mol. However, for historical reasons, molar masses are almost always expressed with the unit g/mol (or equivalently in kg/kmol).

Since 1971, SI defined the "amount of substance" as a separate dimension of measurement. Until 2019, the mole was defined as the amount of substance that has as many constituent particles as there are atoms in 12 grams of carbon-12, with the dalton defined as 1/12 of the mass of a carbon-12 atom. Thus, during that period, the numerical value of the molar mass of a substance expressed in g/mol was exactly equal to the numerical value of the average mass of an entity (atom, molecule, formula unit) of the substance expressed in daltons.

Since 2019, the mole has been redefined in the SI as the amount of any substance containing exactly 6.02214076×10^{23} entities, fixing the numerical value of the Avogadro constant N_{A} when expressed in the unit mol^{−1}, but because the dalton is still defined in terms of the experimentally determined mass of a carbon-12 atom, the numerical equivalence between the molar mass of a substance and the average mass of an entity of the substance is now only approximate, but equality may still be assumed with high accuracy—(the relative discrepancy is only of order 10^{–9}, i.e. within a part per billion).

== Technical background ==
For a pure sample of a substance X, the known molar mass, M(X), is used for calculating the amount of the substance in the sample, n(X), given the mass of the sample, m(X), through the equation: n(X) = m(X)/M(X). If N(X) is the number of entities of the substance in the sample, and m_{a}(X) is the mass of each entity of the substance (atomic mass, molecular mass, or formula mass), then the mass of the sample is m(X) = N(X) ⋅ m_{a}(X), and the amount of substance is n(X) = N(X)/N_{A} = N(X) ⋅ n_{a}, where n_{a} is the elementary amount, an amount consisting of exactly one atomic-scale entity of any kind (atom, molecule, formula unit), analogous to the elementary charge e. Since the elementary amount is the reciprocal of the Avogadro constant, using the relationship M(X) = m(X)/n(X), the molar mass is then given by M(X) = m_{a}(X) ⋅ N_{A} = m_{a}(X)/n_{a} (dimension M/N), i.e. the atomic-scale mass of one entity of the substance per elementary amount.

Given the relative atomic-scale mass (atomic weight, molecular weight, or formula weight) A_{r}(X) of an entity of a substance X, its mass expressed in daltons is m_{a}(X) = A_{r}(X) Da, where the atomic-scale unit of mass is defined as 1 Da = m_{u} = m_{a}(^{12}C)/12 (dimension M). The corresponding atomic-scale unit of amount of substance is the entity (symbol ent), defined as 1 ent = n_{a} (dimension N). So, with A_{r}(X) known, the molar mass can be expressed in daltons per entity as M(X) = A_{r}(X) Da/ent. Thus, the molar mass of a substance X can be calculated as M(X) = A_{r}(X) ⋅ M_{u}, with the molar mass constant M_{u} equal to exactly 1 Da/ent, which (for all practical purposes) is equal to 1 g/mol, as the mole was historically defined such that the Avogadro number (the number of atomic-scale entities comprising one mole) was exactly equal to the number of daltons in a gram (g/Da). This means that (for all practical purposes): 1 mol = (g/Da) ent.

The relationship between the molar mass of carbon-12, M(^{12}C) = 12 g/mol, and its atomic mass, m_{a}(^{12}C) = 12 Da, can be expressed as M(^{12}C) = m_{a}(^{12}C) · N_{A}. Rearranging and substituting the given values into the equation yields the following expression for the Avogadro constant: N_{A} = (g/Da) mol^{−1}, making the Avogadro number equal to the number of daltons in a gram, and equivalently the number of atoms in 12 grams of carbon-12 (as in the 1971 definition of the mole).

The mole was defined in such a way that the numerical value of the molar mass of a substance in g/mol, i.e. M(X)/(g/mol), was equal to the numerical value of the average mass of one entity (atom, molecule, formula unit) in Da, i.e. m_{a}(X)/Da = A_{r}(X), so that M(X) = A_{r}(X) g/mol. The equivalence was exact before the redefinition of the mole in 2019, and is now only approximate, but equality may still be assumed with high accuracy. Thus, for example, the average mass of a molecule of water is about 18.0153 Da, and the molar mass of water is about 18.0153 g/mol. For chemical elements without isolated molecules, such as carbon and metals, the molar mass is calculated using the relative atomic mass of the element, usually given by the standard atomic weight indicated in the periodic table. Thus, for example, the molar mass of iron is about 55.845 g/mol.

== Calculation ==
=== Molar masses of elements ===
The molar mass M(X) of atoms of an element X is given by the relative atomic mass A_{r}(X) of the element multiplied by the molar mass constant, M_{u}, which (for all practical purposes) is equal to 1 g/mol: M(X) = A_{r}(X) ⋅ M_{u}. For normal samples from Earth with typical isotope composition, the atomic weight can be approximated by the standard atomic weight or the conventional atomic weight.

$$\begin{array}{lll}
M(\ce{He}) &= 4.002602(2) \times M_\mathrm{u}  &= 4.002602(2) \text{ g/mol} \\
M(\ce{Ne}) &= 20.1797(6) \times M_\mathrm{u}  &= 20.1797(6) \text{ g/mol} \\
M(\ce{Fe}) &= 55.845(2) \times M_\mathrm{u}  &= 55.845(2) \text{ g/mol} \\
M(\ce{Cu}) &= 63.546(3) \times M_\mathrm{u}  &= 63.546(3) \text{ g/mol} \\
M(\ce{Ag}) &= 107.8682(2) \times M_\mathrm{u}  &= 107.8682(2) \text{ g/mol}
\end{array}$$

Multiplying by the molar mass constant ensures that the calculation is dimensionally correct: relative atomic masses and standard atomic weights are dimensionless quantities (i.e., pure numbers), whereas molar masses have units (in this case, grams per mole).

Some elements are usually encountered as molecules, e.g. hydrogen (H_{2}), nitrogen (N_{2}), oxygen (O_{2}), sulfur (S_{8}), chlorine (Cl_{2}). The molar mass of molecules of these elements is the molar mass of the atoms multiplied by the number of atoms in each molecule:

$$\begin{array}{lll}
M(\ce{H2})  &= 2\times 1.00794(7) \times M_\mathrm{u} &= 2.01588(14) \text{ g/mol} \\
M(\ce{N2})  &= 2\times 14.0067(2) \times M_\mathrm{u} &= 28.0134(4) \text{ g/mol} \\
M(\ce{O2})  &= 2\times 15.9994(3) \times M_\mathrm{u} &= 31.9988(6) \text{ g/mol} \\
M(\ce{S8})  &= 8\times 32.065(5) \times M_\mathrm{u}  &= 256.52(4) \text{ g/mol} \\
M(\ce{Cl2}) &= 2\times 35.453(2) \times M_\mathrm{u}  &= 70.906(4) \text{ g/mol}
\end{array}$$

=== Molar masses of compounds ===
The molar mass M(X) of a compound is given by the sum of the relative atomic masses A_{r}(X_{i}) of the elements (each multiplied by the number of atoms n_{i} per element) which form the compound multiplied by the molar mass constant, M_{u} ≈ 1 g/mol:

$$M(\text{X}) = M_\text{r}(\text{X}) \cdot M_\text{u} = M_\text{u} \sum_i n_i A_\text{r}(\text{X}_i).$$

Here, M_{r}(X) is the relative molar mass, also called molecular weight or formula weight. For normal samples from Earth with typical isotope composition, the standard atomic weight or the conventional atomic weight can be used as an approximation of the relative atomic mass of the sample. Examples are:

$$\begin{array}{lll}
M(\ce{NaCl}) &= [22.98976928(2) + 35.453(2)] \times M_\text{u} \\
&= 58.443(2) \text{ g/mol} \\
M(\ce{C12H22O11}) &= [12 \times 12.0107(8) + 22 \times 1.00794(7) + 11 \times 15.9994(3)] \times M_\text{u} \\
&= 342.297(14) \text{ g/mol}
\end{array}$$

=== Average molar mass of mixtures ===
An average molar mass may be defined for mixtures of substances. This is particularly important in polymer science, where there is usually a molar mass distribution of non-uniform polymers so that different polymer molecules contain different numbers of monomer units. The average molar mass of mixtures $\overline{M}$ can be calculated from the mole fractions x_{i} of the components and their molar masses M_{i}:
$$\overline{M} = \sum_i x_i M_i.$$

It can also be calculated from the mass fractions w_{i} of the components:
$$\frac{1}{\overline{M}} = \sum_i\frac{w_i}{M_i}.$$

As an example, the average molar mass of dry air is 28.9647 g/mol.

== Related quantities ==
Molar mass is closely related to the molecular weight (M.W.) (for molecular compounds) and formula weight (F.W.) (for non-molecular compounds), older terms for what is now more correctly called the relative molar mass (M_{r}), a dimensionless quantity (i.e., a pure number, without units) equal to the molar mass divided by the molar mass constant, calculated from the standard atomic weights of its constituent elements. However, it should be distinguished from the molecular mass (which is confusingly also sometimes known as molecular weight), which is the mass of one molecule (of any single isotopic composition), and to the atomic mass, which is the mass of one atom (of any single isotope). The dalton, symbol Da, is also sometimes used as a unit of molecular weight and formula weight (now called relative molar mass), especially in biochemistry, despite the fact that the quantities are dimensionless as relative masses.

Obsolete terms for molar mass include gram atomic mass for the mass, in grams, of one mole of atoms of an element, and gram molecular mass for the mass, in grams, of one mole of molecules of a compound. The gram-atom is a former term for a mole of atoms, and gram-molecule for a mole of molecules.

=== Molecular mass ===
The molecular mass (m) is the mass of a given molecule: it is usually measured in daltons (Da or u). Different molecules of the same compound may have different molecular masses because they contain different isotopes of an element. This is distinct but related to the molar mass, which is a measure of the average molecular mass of all the molecules in a sample and is usually the more appropriate measure when dealing with macroscopic (weigh-able) quantities of a substance.

Molecular masses are calculated from the atomic masses of each nuclide, while molar masses are calculated from the standard atomic weights of each element. The standard atomic weight takes into account the isotopic distribution of the element in a given sample (usually assumed to be "normal"). For example, water has a molar mass of 18.0153(3) g/mol, but individual water molecules have molecular masses which range between 18.0105646863(15) Da (^{1}H_{2}^{16}O) and 22.0277364(9) Da (^{2}H_{2}^{18}O).

The distinction between molar mass and molecular mass is important because relative molecular masses can be measured directly by mass spectrometry, often to a precision of a few parts per million. This is accurate enough to directly determine the chemical formula of a molecule.

=== DNA synthesis usage ===
The term formula weight has a specific meaning when used in the context of DNA synthesis: whereas an individual phosphoramidite nucleobase to be added to a DNA polymer has protecting groups and has its molecular weight quoted including these groups, the amount of molecular weight that is ultimately added by this nucleobase to a DNA polymer is referred to as the nucleobase's formula weight (i.e., the molecular weight of this nucleobase within the DNA polymer, minus protecting groups).

== Precision and uncertainties ==
The precision to which a molar mass is known depends on the precision of the atomic masses from which it was calculated (and very slightly on the value of the molar mass constant, which depends on the measured value of the dalton). Most atomic masses are known to a precision of at least one part in ten-thousand, often much better (the atomic mass of lithium is a notable, and serious, exception). This is adequate for almost all normal uses in chemistry: it is more precise than most chemical analyses, and exceeds the purity of most laboratory reagents.

The precision of atomic masses, and hence of molar masses, is limited by the knowledge of the isotopic distribution of the element. If a more accurate value of the molar mass is required, it is necessary to determine the isotopic distribution of the sample in question, which may be different from the standard distribution used to calculate the standard atomic mass. The isotopic distributions of the different elements in a sample are not necessarily independent of one another: for example, a sample which has been distilled will be enriched in the lighter isotopes of all the elements present. This complicates the calculation of the standard uncertainty in the molar mass.

A useful convention for normal laboratory work is to quote molar masses to two decimal places for all calculations. This is more accurate than is usually required, but avoids rounding errors during calculations. When the molar mass is greater than 1000 g/mol, it is rarely appropriate to use more than one decimal place. These conventions are followed in most tabulated values of molar masses.

== Measurement ==
Molar masses are almost never measured directly. They may be calculated from standard atomic masses, and are often listed in chemical catalogues and on safety data sheets (SDS). Molar masses typically vary between:

1–238 g/mol for atoms of naturally occurring elements;
10–1000 g/mol for simple chemical compounds;
1000–5000000 g/mol for polymers, proteins, DNA fragments, etc.

While molar masses are almost always, in practice, calculated from atomic weights, they can also be measured in certain cases. Such measurements are much less precise than modern mass spectrometric measurements of atomic weights and molecular masses, and are of mostly historical interest. All of the procedures rely on colligative properties, and any dissociation of the compound must be taken into account.

=== Vapour density ===
The measurement of molar mass by vapour density relies on the principle, first enunciated by Amedeo Avogadro, that equal volumes of gases under identical conditions contain equal numbers of particles. This principle is included in the ideal gas equation:

$$pV = nRT ,$$

where n is the amount of substance. The vapour density (ρ) is given by

$$\rho = {{nM}\over{V}} .$$

Combining these two equations gives an expression for the molar mass in terms of the vapour density for conditions of known pressure and temperature:

$$M = {{RT\rho}\over{p}} .$$

=== Freezing-point depression ===
The freezing point of a solution is lower than that of the pure solvent, and the freezing-point depression (ΔT) is directly proportional to the amount concentration for dilute solutions. When the composition is expressed as a molality, the proportionality constant is known as the cryoscopic constant (K_{f}) and is characteristic for each solvent. If w represents the mass fraction of the solute in solution, and assuming no dissociation of the solute, the molar mass is given by

$$M = {{wK_\text{f}}\over{\Delta T}}.\$$

=== Boiling-point elevation ===
The boiling point of a solution of an involatile solute is higher than that of the pure solvent, and the boiling-point elevation (ΔT) is directly proportional to the amount concentration for dilute solutions. When the composition is expressed as a molality, the proportionality constant is known as the ebullioscopic constant (K_{b}) and is characteristic for each solvent. If w represents the mass fraction of the solute in solution, and assuming no dissociation of the solute, the molar mass is given by

$$M = {{wK_\text{b}}\over{\Delta T}}.\$$

== See also ==
- Mole map (chemistry)
