= Loschmidt constant =

Number of particle in a given volume of an ideal gas

The Loschmidt constant or Loschmidt's number (symbol: n_{0}) is the number of particles (atoms or molecules) of an ideal gas per volume (the number density), and usually quoted at standard temperature and pressure. The 2018 CODATA recommended value is 2.686780111...×10^{25} m^{−3} at 0 °C and 1 atm. It is named after the Austrian physicist Johann Josef Loschmidt, who was the first to estimate the physical size of molecules in 1865. The term Loschmidt constant is also sometimes used to refer to the Avogadro constant, particularly in German texts.

By ideal gas law, $p_0V = Nk_\text{B}T_0$, and since $N = n_0 V$, the Loschmidt constant is given by the relationship

$$n_0 = \frac{p_0}{k_\text{B}T_0},$$

where k_{B} is the Boltzmann constant, p_{0} is the standard pressure, and T_{0} is the standard thermodynamic temperature.

Since the Avogadro constant N_{A} satisfies $R = N_\text{A} k$, the Loschmidt constant satisfies

$$n_0 = \frac{p_0N_\text{A}}{RT_0},$$

where R is the ideal gas constant.

Being a measure of number density, the Loschmidt constant is used to define the amagat, a practical unit of number density for gases and other substances:

$$1\; \textrm{amagat} = n_0 = 2.686\ 780\ 111... \times 10^{25}\;\textrm{m}^{-3}$$,

such that the Loschmidt constant is exactly 1 amagat.

== Modern determinations ==
In the CODATA set of recommended values for physical constants, the Loschmidt constant is calculated from the Avogadro constant and the molar volume of an ideal gas, or equivalently the Boltzmann constant:

$$n_0 := \frac{N_{\mathrm A}}{V_\text{m}} =\frac{p_0}{k_\text{B} T_0},$$

where V_{m} is the molar volume of an ideal gas at the specified temperature and pressure, which can be chosen freely and must be quoted with values of the Loschmidt constant. The Loschmidt constant is exactly defined for exact temperatures and pressures since the 2019 revision of the SI.

== First determinations ==
Loschmidt did not actually calculate a value for the constant which now bears his name, but it is a simple and logical manipulation of his published results. James Clerk Maxwell described the paper in these terms in a public lecture eight years later:

Loschmidt has deduced from the dynamical theory the following remarkable proportion:—As the volume of a gas is to the combined volume of all the molecules contained in it, so is the mean path of a molecule to one-eighth of the diameter of a molecule.

To derive this "remarkable proportion", Loschmidt started from Maxwell's own definition of the mean free path (there is an inconsistency between the result on this page and the page cross-referenced to the mean free path; here appears an additional factor 3/4):

$$\ell = \frac{3}{4n_0\pi d^2},$$

where n_{0} has the same sense as the Loschmidt constant, that is the number of molecules per unit volume, and d is the effective diameter of the molecules (assumed to be spherical). This rearranges to

$$\frac{1}{n_0} = \frac{16}{3} \frac{\pi\ell d^2}{4},$$

where 1/n_{0} is the volume occupied by each molecule in the gas phase, and πℓd^{2}/4 is the volume of the cylinder made by the molecule in its trajectory between two collisions. However, the true volume of each molecule is given by πd^{3}/6, and so n_{0}πd^{3}/6 is the volume occupied by all the molecules not counting the empty space between them. Loschmidt equated this volume with the volume of the liquified gas. Dividing both sides of the equation by n_{0}πd^{3}/6 has the effect of introducing a factor of V_{liquid}/V_{gas}, which Loschmidt called the "condensation coefficient" and which is experimentally measurable. The equation reduces to

$$d = 8\frac{V_\text{l}}{V_\text{g}}\ell$$

relating the diameter of a gas molecule to measurable phenomena.

The number density, the constant which now bears Loschmidt's name, can be found by simply substituting the diameter of the molecule into the definition of the mean free path and rearranging:

$$n_0 = \left(\frac{V_\text{g}}{V_\text{l}}\right)^2 \frac{3}{256\pi\ell^3}.$$

Instead of taking this step, Loschmidt decided to estimate the mean diameter of the molecules in air. This was no minor undertaking, as the condensation coefficient was unknown and had to be estimated – it would be another twelve years before Raoul Pictet and Louis Paul Cailletet would liquify nitrogen for the first time. The mean free path was also uncertain. Nevertheless, Loschmidt arrived at a diameter of about one nanometre, of the correct order of magnitude.

Loschmidt's estimated data for air give a value of n_{0} = 1.81×10^{24} m^{−3}. Eight years later, Maxwell was citing a figure of "about 19 million million million" per cm^{3}, or 1.9×10^{25} m^{−3}.

== See also ==
- Avogadro's law
- List of scientists whose names are used in physical constants
