= Avogadro constant =

Conversion constant for amount of substance

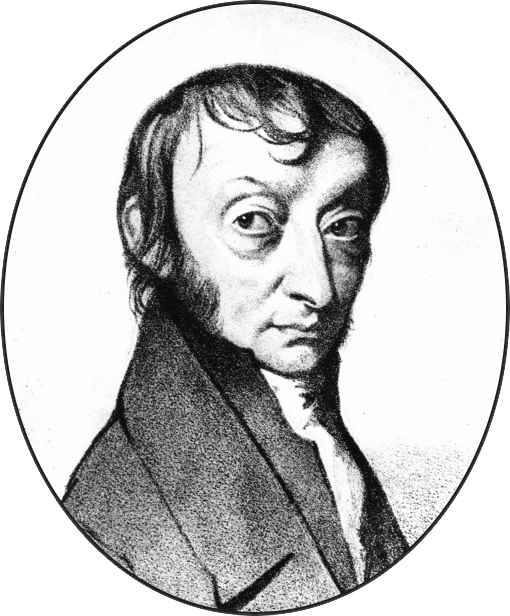
- Amedeo Avogadro
- Symbol: N_{A}
- Exact value: 6.02214076×10^{23} mol^{−1}

In chemistry, the Avogadro constant, commonly denoted N_{A}, is a conversion constant or ratio between an amount of substance and the number of particles that it contains. The particles in question are any designated elementary entity, such as molecules, atoms, ions, or ion pairs. It is an SI defining constant with the exact value 6.02214076×10^{23} mol^{−1} (reciprocal mole). The numerical value of this constant when expressed in terms of the mole is known as the Avogadro number, commonly denoted N_{0}. The Avogadro number is an exact number equal to the number of constituent particles in one mole of any substance (by definition of the mole), historically derived from the experimental determination of the number of atoms in 12 grams of carbon-12 (^{12}C) before the 2019 revision of the SI, i.e. the gram-to-dalton ratio, g/Da. Both the constant and the number are named after the Italian physicist and chemist Amedeo Avogadro.

The Avogadro constant is used as a proportionality factor to define the amount of substance n(X), in a sample of a substance X, in terms of the number of elementary entities N(X) in that sample:

$$n(\mathrm{X}) = \frac{N(\mathrm{X})}{N_{\mathrm{A}}}$$.

The Avogadro constant N_{A} is also the factor that converts the average mass m(X) of one particle of a substance to its molar mass M(X). That is, M(X) = m(X) ⋅ N_{A}. Applying this equation to ^{12}C with an atomic mass of exactly 12 Da and a molar mass of 12 g/mol yields (after rearrangement) the following relation for the Avogadro constant: N_{A} = (g/Da) mol^{−1}, making the Avogadro number N_{0} = g/Da. Historically, this was precisely true, but since the 2019 revision of the SI, the relation is now merely approximate, although equality may still be assumed with high accuracy.

The constant N_{A} also relates the molar volume (the volume per mole) of a substance to the average volume nominally occupied by one of its particles, when both are expressed in the same units of volume. For example, since the molar volume of water in ordinary conditions is about 18 mL/mol, the volume occupied by one molecule of water is about 18/(6.022×10^{23}) mL, or about 0.030 nm^{3} (cubic nanometres). For a crystalline substance, it provides as similarly relationship between the volume of a crystal to that of its unit cell.

== Definition ==
Approximate definition of a mole based on 12 grams of carbon-12

The Avogadro constant was historically derived from the old definition of the mole as the amount of substance in 12 grams of carbon-12 (^{12}C). By this old definition, the numerical value of the Avogadro constant in mol^{−1} (the Avogadro number) was a physical constant that had to be determined experimentally.

The historical relationship of the Avogadro constant to the molar mass of carbon-12, M(^{12}C), and its atomic mass, m(^{12}C), can be expressed in the following equation:
$$N_{\text{A}} = \frac{M(^{12}\text{C})}{m(^{12}\text{C})} = \frac{12\text{ g/mol}}{12\text{ Da}} = \frac{\text{g/mol}}{\text{Da}} = (\text{g/Da})\text{ mol}^{-1}.$$
Thus, N_{0}, the numerical value of N_{A} when expressed in mol^{−1}, was equal to the number of daltons in a gram (g/Da), where the dalton is defined as 1/12 of the mass of a ^{12}C atom.

The redefinition of the mole in 2019, as being the amount of substance consisting of exactly 6.02214076×10^{23} elementary entities, means that the mass of 1 mole of a substance is now exactly the product of the Avogadro number and the average mass of one of the entities involved. The dalton, however, is still defined as 1/12 of the mass of a ^{12}C atom, which must be determined experimentally and is known only with finite accuracy. Thus, prior experiments that aimed to determine the numerical value of the Avogadro constant when expressed in reciprocal moles—i.e. the Avogadro number (now numerically fixed)—are re-interpreted as measurements of the numerical value in grams of the dalton.

By the old definition of mole, the numerical value of the mass of one mole of a substance expressed in grams (i.e., its molar mass in g/mol or kg/kmol), was precisely equal to the average mass of one particle expressed in daltons. With the new definition, this numerical equivalence is no longer exact, as it is affected by the uncertainty in the value of the gram-to-dalton (g/Da) mass-unit ratio. However, it may still be assumed for all practical purposes. For example, the average mass of one molecule of water is about 18.0153 daltons, and an amount of one mole of water has a corresponding macroscopic mass of about 18.0153 grams. Also, the Avogadro number is the approximate number of nucleons (protons and neutrons) in one gram of ordinary matter.

An amount of substance consisting of just a single elementary entity might be thought of as an "elementary amount", analogous to the elementary charge, e. Letting n_{a} denote this elementary amount, then 1 mol = N_{0} n_{a}. With the mole defined such that N_{A} = N_{0}/mol, this can be rearranged as 1 mol = N_{0}/N_{A}. Thus, n_{a} = 1/N_{A}, the reciprocal of the Avogadro constant. The fundamental definition of the Avogadro constant itself is therefore one per elementary amount (N_{A} = 1/n_{a}), independent of any macroscopic base unit chosen for the physical quantity. (Since there is an aggregate of an Avogadro number of elementary entities in one mole, the Avogadro constant can also be expressed (in terms of the mole) as an Avogadro number per mole—but this is not its "definition".) The Avogadro constant, a well-defined quantity value with dimension N^{−1}, independent of the mole, is therefore a bona fide defining constant for the 2019 redefinition of the mole.

Introducing n_{a} in place of 1/N_{A}, means that n(X) = N(X) n_{a}—amount of substance is an aggregate of N(X) elementary entities—which is easier to comprehend than N(X) "reciprocal Avogadro constants". Also the molar mass is then M(X) = m(X)/n_{a}—the entity mass per entity, which is self-evident.

In older literature, the Avogadro number was also denoted N, although that conflicts with the symbol for number of particles in statistical mechanics.

== History ==
=== Origin of the concept ===
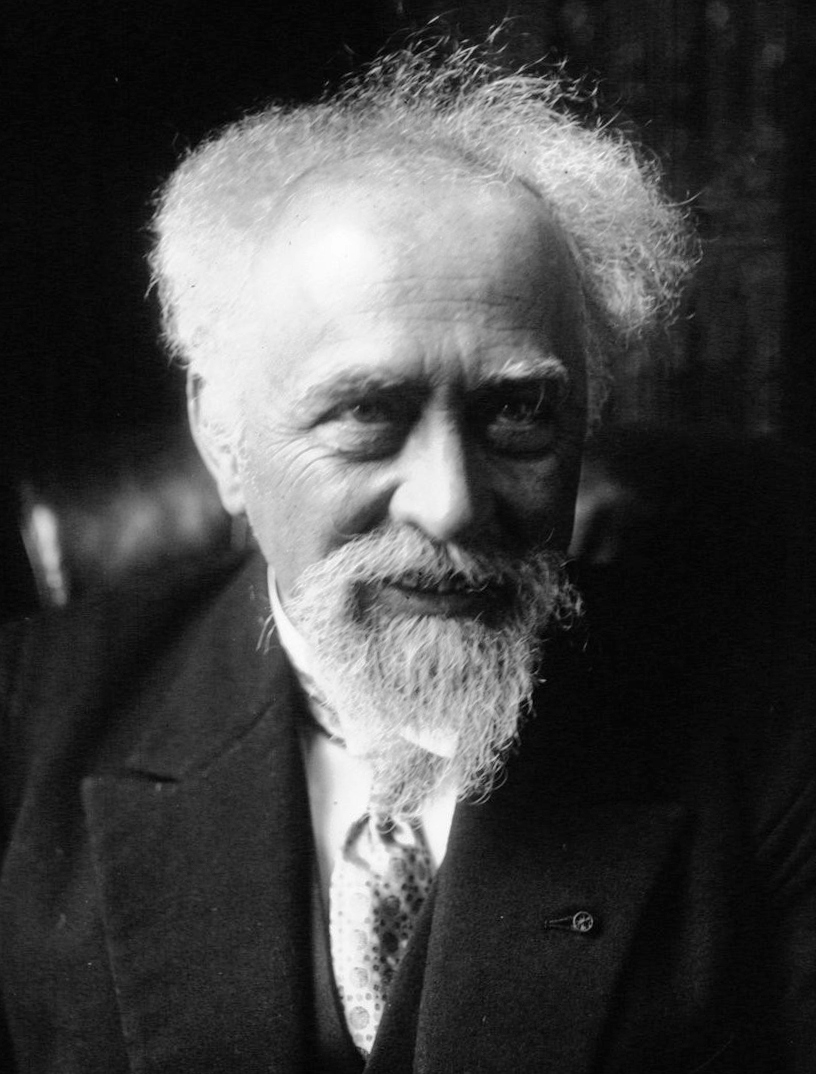
Jean Perrin in 1926

The Avogadro constant is named after the Italian scientist Amedeo Avogadro (1776–1856), who, in 1811, first proposed that the volume of a gas (at a given pressure and temperature) is proportional to the number of atoms or molecules regardless of the nature of the gas.

Avogadro's hypothesis was popularized four years after his death by Stanislao Cannizzaro, who advocated Avogadro's work at the Karlsruhe Congress in 1860.

The name Avogadro's number was coined in 1909 by the physicist Jean Perrin, who defined it as the number of molecules in exactly 32 grams of oxygen gas. This definition numerically equates the mass of a mole of a substance, in grams, to the mass of one molecule relative to the mass of a hydrogen atom. Because of the law of definite proportions, the mass of a hydrogen atom was the natural unit of atomic mass and was assumed to be 1/16 of the atomic mass of oxygen.

=== First measurements ===
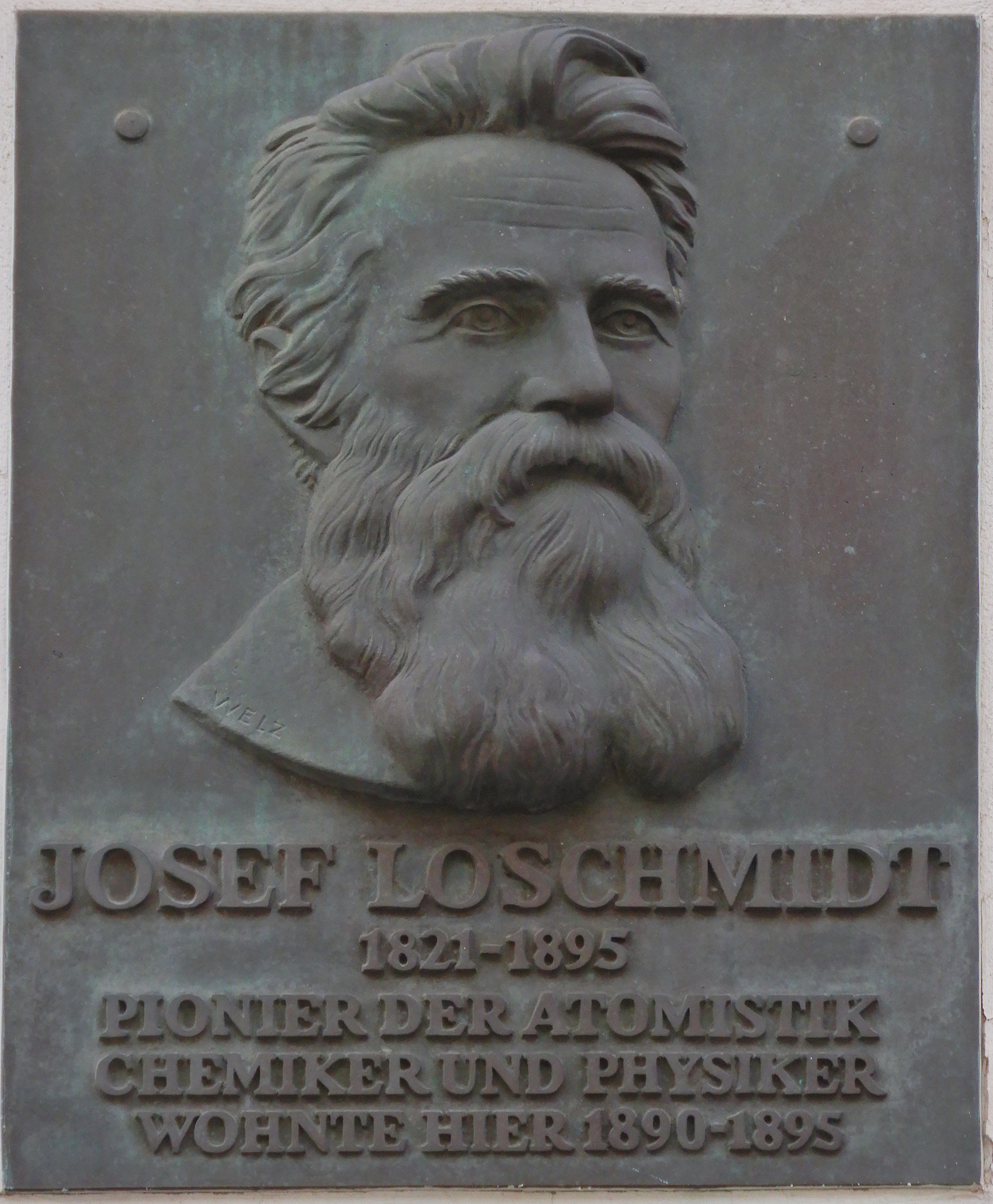
Josef Loschmidt

The value of Avogadro's number (not yet known by that name) was first obtained indirectly by Josef Loschmidt in 1865, by estimating the number of particles in a given volume of gas. This value, the number density n_{0} of particles in an ideal gas, is now called the Loschmidt constant in his honor, and is related to the Avogadro constant, N_{A}, by

$$n_0 = \frac{p_0N_{\rm A}}{R\,T_0},$$

where p_{0} is the pressure, R is the gas constant, and T_{0} is the absolute temperature. Because of this work, the symbol L is sometimes used for the Avogadro constant, and, in German literature, that name may be used for both constants, distinguished only by the units of measurement. (However, N_{A} should not be confused with the entirely different Loschmidt constant in English-language literature.)

Perrin himself determined the Avogadro number, which he called "Avogadro's constant" (constante d'Avogadro), by several different experimental methods. He was awarded the 1926 Nobel Prize in Physics, largely for this work.

The electric charge per mole of electrons is a constant called the Faraday constant and has been known since 1834, when Michael Faraday published his works on electrolysis. In 1910, Robert Millikan with the help of Harvey Fletcher obtained the first measurement of the charge on an electron. Dividing the charge on a mole of electrons by the charge on a single electron provided a more accurate estimate of the Avogadro number.

=== X-ray crystallography ===
X-ray crystallography uses the diffraction of X-rays by a crystal to accurately measure the distances between layers in its lattice, from which the volume occupied by each atom can be determined. The Avogadro Project used this technique to measure the unit cell dimensions of extremely pure single-crystal spheres of silicon-28, with the goal of a more accurate silicon-based definition of the Avogadro constant.

=== SI definition of 1971 ===
In 1971, in its 14th conference, the International Bureau of Weights and Measures (BIPM) decided to regard the amount of substance as an independent dimension of measurement, with the mole as its base unit in the International System of Units (SI). Specifically, the mole was defined as the amount of a substance that contains as many elementary entities as there are atoms in 12 grams (0.012 kilograms) of carbon-12 (^{12}C). Thus, in particular, an amount of one mole of carbon 12 had a corresponding mass that was exactly 12 grams of that element.

By this definition, one mole of any substance contained exactly as many elementary entities as one mole of any other substance. However, this number N_{0} was a physical constant that had to be experimentally determined since it depended on the mass (in grams) of one atom of ^{12}C, and therefore, it was known only to a limited number of decimal digits. The common rule of thumb that "one gram of matter contains N_{0} nucleons" was exact for carbon-12, but slightly inexact for other elements and isotopes.

In the same conference, the BIPM also named N_{A} (the factor that related the amount of a substance to the corresponding number of particles) the "Avogadro constant". However, the term "Avogadro number" continued to be used, especially in introductory works. As a consequence of this definition, N_{A} was not a pure number, but had the quantity dimension of reciprocal of amount of substance (N^{−1}).

=== SI redefinition of 2019 ===
Before 2019, the mole was defined by the amount of substance in exactly 12 grams of carbon-12. Effective 20 May 2019, the BIPM defined the Avogadro constant N_{A} as the exact value 6.02214076×10^{23} mol^{−1}, thus redefining the mole as the amount of a substance having exactly 6.02214076×10^{23} constituent particles of that substance. One consequence of this change is that the mass of a mole of ^{12}C atoms is no longer exactly 0.012 kg. On the other hand, the dalton, Da (a.k.a. unified atomic mass unit, u), remains unchanged as 1/12 of the mass of ^{12}C. Thus, the molar mass constant remains very close to but no longer exactly equal to 1 g/mol, although the difference (1.0×10^{−9} in relative terms for the CODATA 2022 recommended value) is insignificant for all practical purposes.

== Connection to other constants ==
The Avogadro constant N_{A} is related to other physical constants and properties.

- It relates the molar gas constant R and the Boltzmann constant k_{B}, which in the SI is defined to be exactly 1.380649×10^{−23} J/K:
  R = k_{B} N_{A} = 8.31446261815324 J⋅mol^{−1}⋅K^{−1}.
- It relates the Faraday constant F and the elementary charge e, which in the SI is defined as exactly 1.602176634×10^{−19} C:
  F = e N_{A} = 9.648533212...×10^{4} C⋅mol^{−1}.
- It relates the molar mass constant M_{u} and the atomic mass constant m_{u} currently 1.66053906892(52)×10^{−27} kg:
  M_{u} = m_{u} N_{A} = 1.00000000105(31)×10^{−3} kg⋅mol^{−1}.

== See also ==
- Committee on Data of the International Science Council
- List of scientists whose names are used in physical constants
- Mole Day
