= Johann Josef Loschmidt =

Austrian scientist (1821–1895)

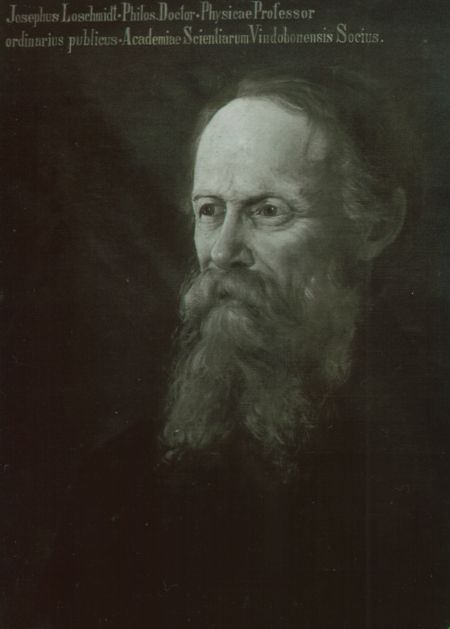
- Johann Josef Loschmidt
- Born: 15 March 1821; Putschirn, Austrian Empire (now Počerny, Karlovy Vary, Czech Republic)
- Died: 8 July 1895 (aged 74); Vienna, Austria-Hungary
- Known for: Loschmidt constant; Loschmidt's paradox
- Scientific career
- Fields: chemistry, physics
- Doctoral advisor: Joseph Stefan

Johann Josef Loschmidt (15 March 1821 – 8 July 1895), better known as Josef Loschmidt, was an Austrian scientist who performed ground-breaking work in chemistry, physics (thermodynamics, optics, electrodynamics), and crystal forms.

Born in Karlsbad, a town in the Austrian Empire (now Karlovy Vary, Czech Republic), Loschmidt became professor of physical chemistry at the University of Vienna in 1868.

He had two early mentors. The first was Bohemian priest Adalbert Czech, who persuaded Loschmidt's parents to send young Josef to high school in the Piarist monastery in Schlackenwerth and, in 1837, to advanced high-school classes in Prague.

This was followed by two years of philosophy and mathematics at Prague's Charles University, where Loschmidt met his second important mentor. This was philosophy professor Franz Serafin Exner, whose eyesight was failing, and who asked Loschmidt to be his personal reader. Exner was known for his innovative school reforms, which included promoting mathematics and science as important subjects. He suggested to Loschmidt, who became a close personal friend, that he apply mathematics to psychological phenomena. In the process of doing this, he became a very able mathematician.

The era, when Loschmidt gradually developed his ideas on molecular structures, was to be a notable epoch in science. It was the time when the Kinetic Theory of Gases was being developed.

His 1861 booklet, Chemische Studien ("chemical studies"), proposed two-dimensional representations for over 300 molecules in a style remarkably similar to that used by modern chemists. Among these were aromatic molecules such as benzene (C_{6}H_{6}), and related triazines. Loschmidt symbolized the benzene nucleus by a large circle, which he said was to indicate the yet-undetermined structure of the compound. Some have argued, however, that he intended this as the suggestion of a cyclical structure, four years before that of Kekulé, who is better known and is generally credited with the discovery of benzene's cyclic structure.

In 1865, Loschmidt was the first to estimate the size of air molecules: his result was only twice the true size, a remarkable feat given the approximations he had to make. His method allowed the size of any gas molecules to be related to measurable phenomena, and hence to determine how many molecules are in a given volume of gas. This latter quantity is now known as the Loschmidt constant in his honour; its modern value is 2.65×10^{19} molecules per cubic centimetre at standard temperature and pressure (STP).

Loschmidt and his younger university colleague Ludwig Boltzmann became good friends. His critique of Boltzmann's attempt to derive the second law of thermodynamics from kinetic theory became famous as the "reversibility paradox". It led Boltzmann to his statistical concept of entropy as a logarithmic tally of the number of microstates corresponding to a given thermodynamic state.

Loschmidt retired from university in 1891 and died in 1895 in Vienna.
