= Committee on Data of the International Science Council =

Internal open science organization

- Abbreviation: CODATA
- Formation: 1966
- Type: International non-governmental organization
- Location: Paris, France
- Region served: Worldwide
- Official language: English, French
- President: Mercè Crosas (2023–)
- Parent organization: International Science Council (ISC)
- Website: codata.org

The Committee on Data of the International Science Council (CODATA) was established in 1966 as the Committee on Data for Science and Technology, originally part of the International Council of Scientific Unions, now part of the International Science Council (ISC). Since November 2023 its president is the Catalan researcher Mercè Crosas.

CODATA exists to promote global collaboration, to advance open science, and to improve the availability and usability of data for all areas of research. CODATA supports the principle that data produced by research and susceptible to being used for research should be as open as possible and as closed as necessary. CODATA works also to advance the interoperability and the usability of such data; research data should be FAIR (findable, accessible, interoperable and reusable). By promoting this policy, technological, and cultural changes that are essential to promote open science, CODATA helps advance the ISC's vision and mission of advancing science as a global public good.

The CODATA Strategic Plan 2015 and Prospectus of Strategy and Achievement 2016 identify three priority areas:

1. promoting principles, policies and practices for open data and open science;
2. advancing the frontiers of data science;
3. building capacity for open science by improving data skills and the functions of national science systems needed to support open data.

CODATA achieves these objectives through a number of standing committees and strategic executive led initiatives, and through its task groups and working groups. CODATA also works closely with member unions and associations of ISC to promote the efforts on open data and open science.

== Publications and conferences ==
CODATA supports the Data Science Journal and collaborates on major data conferences like SciDataCon and International Data Week.

In October 2020 CODATA is co-organising an International FAIR Symposium together with the GO FAIR initiative to provide a forum for advancing international and cross-domain convergence around FAIR. The event will bring together a global data community with an interest in combining data across domains for a host of research issues – including major global challenges, such as those relating to the Sustainable Development Goals. Outcomes will directly link to the CODATA Decadal Programme Data for the Planet: making data work for cross-domain grand challenges and to the developments of GO FAIR community towards the Internet of FAIR data and services.

== Task Group on Fundamental Physical Constants ==
One of the CODATA strategic Initiatives and Task Groups concentrates on Fundamental Physical Constants. Established in 1969, its purpose is to periodically provide the international scientific and technological communities with an internationally accepted set of values of the fundamental physical constants and closely related conversion factors for use worldwide.

The first such CODATA set was published in 1973. Later versions are named based on the year of the data incorporated; the 1986 CODATA (published April 1987) used data up to 1 January 1986. All subsequent releases use data up to the end of the stated year, and are necessarily published a year or two later, with an additional gap between the values themselves and the paper explaining how they were arrived at: 1998 (April 2000), 2002 (January 2005), 2006 (June 2008), 2010 (November 2012), 2014 (June 2015), 2018 (May 2019), and 2022 (May/August 2024).

The CODATA recommended values of fundamental physical constants are published at the National Institute of Standards and Technology Reference on Constants, Units, and Uncertainty.

=== Schedule ===
Since 1998, the task group has produced a new version every four years, incorporating results published up to the end of the specified year.

In order to support the 2019 revision of the SI, adopted at the 26th General Conference on Weights and Measures on 16 November 2018, CODATA made a special release that was published in October 2017. It incorporates all data up to 1 July 2017, and determines the final numerical values of h, e, k, and N_{A} that are used for the new SI definitions.

The regular version with a closing date of 31 December 2018 was used to produce the new 2018 CODATA values that were made available by the time the revised SI came into force on 20 May 2019. This was necessary because the redefinitions have a significant (mostly beneficial) effect on the uncertainties and correlation coefficients reported by CODATA.

== See also ==
- Commission on Isotopic Abundances and Atomic Weights
- Particle Data Group
