= Mole (unit) =

SI unit of amount of substance

mole
- One mole contains exactly 6.02214076×10^{23} elementary entities, approximately equivalent to the number of atoms in 12 grams of carbon-12 in the historical definition

General information
- Unit system: SI
- Unit of: amount of substance
- Symbol: mol

The mole (symbol mol) is a unit of measurement, the base unit in the International System of Units (SI) for amount of substance. One mole is an aggregate of exactly 6.02214076×10^{23} elementary entities which can be atoms, molecules, ions, ion pairs, or other particles. This number of entities equals 602,214,076,000,000,000,000,000, approximately 602 sextillion or 602 billion multiplied by one trillion. The number of particles in a mole is the Avogadro number (symbol N_{0}) and the numerical value of the Avogadro constant (symbol N_{A}) has units of mol^{−1}. The relationship between the mole, Avogadro number, and Avogadro constant can be expressed in the following equation:
$$1\text{ mol} = \frac{N_0}{N_{\text{A}}} = \frac{6.02214076\times10^{23}}{N_{\text{A}}}$$
The current SI value of the mole is based on the historical definition of the mole as the amount of substance that corresponds to the number of atoms in 12 grams of ^{12}C, which made the molar mass of a compound in grams per mole, numerically equal to the average molecular mass or formula mass of the compound expressed in daltons. With the 2019 revision of the SI, the numerical equivalence is now only approximate, but may still be assumed with high accuracy.

Conceptually, the mole is similar to the concept of dozen or other convenient grouping used to discuss collections of identical objects. Because laboratory-scale objects contain a vast number of tiny atoms, the number of entities in the grouping must be huge to be useful for work.

The mole is widely used in chemistry as a convenient way to express amounts of reactants and amounts of products of chemical reactions. For example, the chemical equation 2 H_{2} + O_{2} → 2 H_{2}O can be interpreted to mean that for each 2 mol molecular hydrogen (H_{2}) and 1 mol molecular oxygen (O_{2}) that react, 2 mol of water (H_{2}O) form. The concentration of a solution is commonly expressed by its molar concentration, defined as the amount of dissolved substance per unit volume of solution, for which the unit typically used is mole per litre (mol/L).

== Concepts ==
=== As a set ===
Conceptually a mole is similar to words like "pair" or "dozen". These words describe a set of identical objects—i.e. a collection or aggregate of the objects themselves, not the numbers 2 or 12. The unusual and daunting aspect of a mole is that the number of objects in the set, given by the Avogadro number, is difficult to comprehend. To be useful as a unit, the mole needs to describe the amount in a sample containing a number of atoms (or other elementary entities) that can be manipulated in an ordinary chemistry lab. Atoms are so small that not just trillions but trillions-of-trillions of atoms are needed to create an aggregate large enough to work with.

=== Relation to the Avogadro constant ===
The number of entities (symbol N) in a one-mole sample equals the Avogadro number (symbol N_{0}), a dimensionless quantity. The Avogadro constant (symbol N_{A}) is given by the Avogadro number multiplied by the unit reciprocal mole (mol^{−1}), i.e. N_{A} = N_{0}/mol. The ratio n = N/N_{A} is a measure of the amount of substance (with the unit mole). The Avogadro constant was determined by a measurement of the number of ^{28}Si atoms in a single crystalline sample.

=== Nature of the entities ===
Depending on the nature of the substance, an elementary entity may be an atom, a molecule, an ion, an ion pair, or a subatomic particle such as a proton. For example, 10 moles of water (a chemical compound) and 10 moles of mercury (a chemical element) contain equal numbers of particles of each substance, with one atom of mercury for each molecule of water, despite the two quantities having different volumes and different masses.

The mole is an amount corresponding to a given count (an Avogadro number) of elementary entities. Usually, the entities counted are chemically identical and individually distinct. For example, a solution may contain a certain number of dissolved molecules that are more or less independent of each other. However, the constituent entities in a solid are fixed and bound in a lattice arrangement, yet they may be separable without losing their chemical identity. Thus, the solid is composed of a certain number of moles of such entities. In yet other cases, such as diamond, where the entire crystal is essentially a single molecule, the mole is still used to express the number of atoms bound together, rather than a count of molecules. Thus, common chemical conventions apply to the definition of the constituent entities of a substance, in other cases exact definitions may be specified. The molar mass of a substance is equal to its relative atomic (or molecular) mass multiplied by the molar mass constant, which is almost exactly 1 g/mol.

== Similar units ==
Like chemists, chemical engineers use the unit mole extensively, but different unit multiples may be more suitable for industrial use. For example, the SI unit for volume is the cubic metre, a much larger unit than the commonly used litre in the chemical laboratory. When amount of substance is also expressed in kmol (1000 mol) in industrial-scaled processes, the numerical value of molarity remains the same, as $\frac{\text{kmol}}{\text{m}^3}=\frac{1000\text{ mol}}{1000\text{ L}}=\frac{\text{mol}}{\text{L}}$. Chemical engineers once used the kilogram-mole (notation kg-mol), which is defined as the number of entities in 12 kg of ^{12}C, and often referred to the mole as the gram-mole (notation g-mol), then defined as the number of entities in 12 g of ^{12}C, when dealing with laboratory data.

Late 20th-century chemical engineering practice came to use the kilomole (kmol), which was numerically identical to the kilogram-mole (until the 2019 revision of the SI, which redefined the mole by fixing the value of the Avogadro constant, making it very nearly equivalent to but no longer exactly equal to the gram-mole), but whose name and symbol adopt the SI convention for standard multiples of metric units – thus, kmol means 1000 mol. This is equivalent to the use of kg instead of g. The use of kmol is not only for "magnitude convenience" but also makes the equations used for modelling chemical engineering systems coherent. For example, the conversion of a flowrate of kg/s to kmol/s only requires dividing by the molar mass in kg/kmol (which is equivalent to g/mol, as $\frac{\text{kg}}{\text{kmol}}=\frac{1000\text{ g}}{1000\text{ mol}}=\frac{\text{g}}{\text{mol}}$) without multiplying by 1000 unless the basic SI unit of mol/s were to be used, which would otherwise require the molar mass to be converted to kg/mol.

For convenience in avoiding conversions in the imperial (or US customary units), some engineers adopted the pound-mole (notation lb-mol or lbmol), which is defined as the number of entities in 12 lb of ^{12}C. One lb-mol is equal to 453.59237 g‑mol, which is the same numerical value as the number of grams in an international avoirdupois pound.

Greenhouse and growth chamber lighting for plants is sometimes expressed in micromoles per square metre per second, where 1 mol photons ≈ 6.02×10^{23} photons. The obsolete unit einstein is variously defined as the energy in one mole of photons and also as simply one mole of photons.

== Derived units and SI multiples ==
The only SI derived unit with a special name derived from the mole is the katal, defined as one mole per second of catalytic activity. Like other SI units, the mole can also be modified by adding a metric prefix that multiplies it by a power of 10:

SI multiples of mole (mol)
Submultiples			Multiples		
Value	SI symbol	Name	Value	SI symbol	Name
10^{−1} mol	dmol	decimole	10^{1} mol	damol	decamole
10^{−2} mol	cmol	centimole	10^{2} mol	hmol	hectomole
10^{−3} mol	mmol	millimole	10^{3} mol	kmol	kilomole
10^{−6} mol	μmol	micromole	10^{6} mol	Mmol	megamole
10^{−9} mol	nmol	nanomole	10^{9} mol	Gmol	gigamole
10^{−12} mol	pmol	picomole	10^{12} mol	Tmol	teramole
10^{−15} mol	fmol	femtomole	10^{15} mol	Pmol	petamole
10^{−18} mol	amol	attomole	10^{18} mol	Emol	examole
10^{−21} mol	zmol	zeptomole	10^{21} mol	Zmol	zettamole
10^{−24} mol	ymol	yoctomole	10^{24} mol	Ymol	yottamole
10^{−27} mol	rmol	rontomole	10^{27} mol	Rmol	ronnamole
10^{−30} mol	qmol	quectomole	10^{30} mol	Qmol	quettamole

One femtomole is exactly 602214076 molecules; attomole and smaller quantities do not correspond to a whole number of entities. The yoctomole, equal to around 0.6 of an individual molecule, did make appearances in scientific journals in the year the yocto- prefix was officially implemented.

== History ==
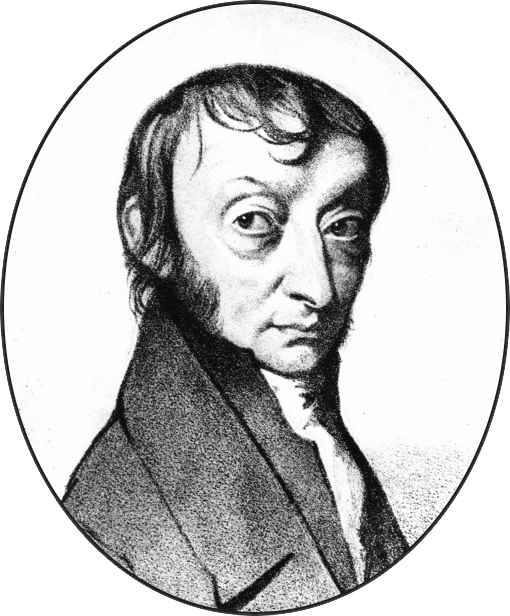
Avogadro, who inspired the Avogadro constant

The history of the mole is intertwined with that of units of molecular mass, and the Avogadro constant.

The first table of standard atomic weight was published by John Dalton (1766–1844) in 1805, based on a system in which the relative atomic mass of hydrogen was defined as 1. These relative atomic masses were based on the stoichiometric proportions of chemical reaction and compounds, a fact that greatly aided their acceptance; it was not necessary for a chemist to subscribe to atomic theory (which was not universally accepted at the time) to make practical use of the tables. This would lead to some confusion between atomic masses (promoted by proponents of atomic theory) and equivalent weights (promoted by its opponents and which sometimes differed from relative atomic masses by an integer factor), which would last throughout much of the nineteenth century.

Jöns Jacob Berzelius (1779–1848) was instrumental in the determination of relative atomic masses to ever-increasing accuracy. He was also the first chemist to use oxygen as the standard to which other masses were referred. Oxygen is a useful standard, as, unlike hydrogen, it forms compounds with most other elements, especially metals. However, he chose to fix the atomic mass of oxygen as 100, which did not catch on.

Charles Frédéric Gerhardt (1816–56), Henri Victor Regnault (1810–78) and Stanislao Cannizzaro (1826–1910) expanded on Berzelius' works, resolving many of the problems of unknown stoichiometry of compounds, and the use of atomic masses attracted a large consensus by the time of the Karlsruhe Congress (1860). The convention had reverted to defining the atomic mass of hydrogen as 1, although at the level of precision of measurements at that time – relative uncertainties of around 1% – this was numerically equivalent to the later standard of oxygen = 16. However the chemical convenience of having oxygen as the primary atomic mass standard became ever more evident with advances in analytical chemistry and the need for ever more accurate atomic mass determinations.

The name mole is an 1897 translation of the German unit Mol, coined by the chemist Wilhelm Ostwald in 1894 from the German word Molekül (molecule). The related concept of equivalent mass had been in use at least a century earlier.

In chemistry, it has been known since Proust's law of definite proportions (1794) that knowledge of the mass of each of the components in a chemical system is not sufficient to define the system. Amount of substance can be described as mass divided by Proust's "definite proportions", and contains information that is missing from the measurement of mass alone. As demonstrated by Dalton's law of partial pressures (1803), a measurement of mass is not even necessary to measure the amount of substance (although in practice it is usual). There are many physical relationships between amount of substance and other physical quantities, the most notable one being the ideal gas law (where the relationship was first demonstrated in 1857). The term "mole" was first used in a textbook describing these colligative properties.

=== Standardization ===
Developments in mass spectrometry led to the adoption of oxygen-16 as the standard substance, in lieu of natural oxygen.

The oxygen-16 definition was replaced with one based on carbon-12 during the 1960s. The International Bureau of Weights and Measures defined the mole as "the amount of substance of a system which contains as many elementary entities as there are atoms in 0.012 kilograms of carbon-12." Thus, by that definition, one mole of pure ^{12}C had a mass of exactly 12 g. The four different definitions were equivalent to within 1%.

Scale basis	Scale basis relative to ^{12}C = 12	Relative deviation from the ^{12}C = 12 scale
Atomic mass of hydrogen = 1	1.00794(7)	−0.788%
Atomic mass of oxygen = 16	15.9994(3)	+0.00375%
Relative atomic mass of ^{16}O = 16	15.9949146221(15)	+0.0318%

Because a dalton, a unit commonly used to measure atomic mass, is exactly 1/12 of the mass of a carbon-12 atom, this definition of the mole entailed that the mass of one mole of a compound or element in grams was numerically equal to the average mass of one molecule or atom of the substance in daltons, and that the number of daltons in a gram was equal to the number of elementary entities in a mole. Because the mass of a nucleon (i.e. a proton or neutron) is approximately 1 dalton and the nucleons in an atom's nucleus make up the overwhelming majority of its mass, this definition also entailed that the mass of one mole of a substance was roughly equivalent to the number of nucleons in one atom or molecule of that substance.

Since the definition of the gram was not mathematically tied to that of the dalton, the number of molecules per mole N_{A} (the Avogadro constant) had to be determined experimentally. The experimental value adopted by CODATA in 2010 is N_{A} = 6.02214129(27)×10^{23} mol^{−1}. In 2011 the measurement was refined to 6.02214078(18)×10^{23} mol^{−1}.

The mole was made the seventh SI base unit in 1971 by the 14th CGPM.

=== 2019 revision of the SI ===
Before the 2019 revision of the SI, the mole was defined as the amount of substance of a system that contains as many elementary entities as there are atoms in 12 grams of carbon-12 (the most common isotope of carbon). The term gram-molecule was formerly used to mean one mole of molecules, and gram-atom for one mole of atoms. For example, 1 mole of MgBr_{2} is 1 gram-molecule of MgBr_{2} but 3 gram-atoms of MgBr_{2}.

In 2011, the 24th meeting of the General Conference on Weights and Measures (CGPM) agreed to a plan for a possible revision of the SI base unit definitions at an undetermined date.

On 16 November 2018, after a meeting of scientists from more than 60 countries at the CGPM in Versailles, France, all SI base units were defined in terms of physical constants. This meant that each SI unit, including the mole, would not be defined in terms of any physical objects but rather they would be defined by physical constants that are, in their nature, exact.

Such changes officially came into effect on 20 May 2019. Following such changes, "one mole" of a substance was redefined as containing "exactly 6.02214076×10^{23} elementary entities" of that substance.

== Criticism ==
Since its adoption into the International System of Units in 1971, criticisms of the concept of the mole as a unit like the metre or the second have arisen:

- the number of molecules, etc. in a given amount of material is a fixed dimensionless quantity that can be expressed simply as a number, not requiring a distinct base unit;
- the SI thermodynamic mole is irrelevant to analytical chemistry and could cause avoidable costs to advanced economies
- the mole is not a true metric (i.e. measuring) unit, rather it is a parametric unit, and amount of substance is a parametric base quantity
- the SI defines numbers of entities as quantities of dimension one, and thus ignores the ontological distinction between entities and units of continuous quantities
- the mole is often used interchangeably and inconsistently in online sources to refer to both a unit and a quantity without appropriate use of amount of substance causing confusion for novice chemistry students.

== Mole Day ==
October 23, denoted 10/23 in the US, is recognized by some as Mole Day. It is an informal holiday in honor of the unit among chemists. The date is derived from the Avogadro number, which is approximately 6.022×10^{23}. It starts at 6:02 a.m. and ends at 6:02 p.m. Alternatively, some chemists celebrate June 2 (06/02), June 22 (6/22), or 6 February (06.02), a reference to the 6.02 or 6.022 part of the constant.

== See also ==
- Element–reactant–product table
- Faraday constant – Physical constant: Electric charge of one mole of electrons
- Mole fraction – Proportion of a constituent in a mixture
- Dalton (unit) – Standard unit of mass for atomic-scale entities
- Molecular mass – Mass of a given molecule in daltons
- Molar mass – Mass per amount of substance
