= Scientific phenomena named after people =

This is a list of scientific phenomena and concepts named after people (eponymous phenomena). For other lists of eponyms, see eponym.

== A ==
- Abderhalden–Fauser reaction – Emil Abderhalden and August Fauser (1856–1938)
- Abney effect – William de Wiveleslie Abney
- Abrikosov lattice – Alexei Alexeyevich Abrikosov
- Aharonov–Bohm effect – Yakir Aharonov and David Bohm
- Alfvén wave – Hannes Olof Gösta Alfvén
- Alhazen's problem – Alhazen
- Allais effect – Maurice Allais
- Allee effect – Warder Clyde Allee
- Amdahl's law, a.k.a. Amdahl's argument – Gene Amdahl
- Ampère's law – André-Marie Ampère
- Anderson–Higgs mechanism (a.k.a. Higgs mechanism) – Peter Higgs and Philip Warren Anderson
- Anderson–Darling test – Theodore Wilbur Anderson and Donald A. Darling
- Andreev reflection – Alexander F. Andreev
- Apgar score – Virginia Apgar
- Arago spot – Dominique François Jean Arago
- Michaelis–Arbuzov reaction – Aleksandr Erminingeldovich Arbuzov and August Karl Arnold Michaelis
- Archimedean spiral, Archimedes number – Archimedes
- Argand diagram – Jean Robert Argand
- Aristotle's lantern – Aristotle
- Armstrong limit or Armstrong's line – Harry George Armstrong
- Armstrong oscillator – Edwin Armstrong
- Arndt–Eistert synthesis – Fritz Arndt and Bernd Eistert
- Arndt–Schulz law/principle/rule – Rudolf Arndt and Hugo Paul Friedrich Schulz
- Arrhenius equation – Svante August Arrhenius
- Ashkin–Teller model (a.k.a. Potts model) – Julius Ashkin and Edward Teller
- Asinger reaction – Friedrich Asinger
- Auger effect (a.k.a. Auger–Meitner effect), electron – Pierre Victor Auger and Lise Meitner
- Autler–Townes effect – Stanley H. Autler and Charles H. Townes
- Auwers synthesis – Karl von Auwers
- Avogadro's law, Avogadro constant, Avogadro number – Count Lorenzo Romano Amedeo Carlo Avogadro di Quaregna e Cerreto

== B ==
- Baeyer–Drewsen indigo synthesis (often incorrectly named for Drewson) – Johann Friedrich Wilhelm Adolf von Baeyer and Viggo Drewsen
- Baeyer–Villiger oxidation and Baeyer–Villiger rearrangement – Johann Friedrich Wilhelm Adolf von Baeyer and Victor Villiger
- Babinet's principle – Jacques Babinet
- Babler–Dauben oxidation – James Babler and William Garfield Dauben
- Bagnold number – Ralph Alger Bagnold
- Baily's beads – Francis Baily
- Baker–Nathan effect – John William Baker and Wilfred S. Nathan
- Bakerian mimicry – Herbert G. Baker
- Baldwin effect (astronomy) – Jack Allen Baldwin
- Baldwin effect (Baldwinian evolution, Ontogenic evolution) – James Mark Baldwin
- Baldwin's rules – Jack Edward Baldwin
- Balmer line, series – Johann Jakob Balmer
- Bamberger rearrangement – Eugen Bamberger
- Bamford–Stevens reaction – William Randall Bamford and Thomas Stevens Stevens
- Barkhausen effect – Heinrich Barkhausen
- Barnett effect – Samuel Jackson Barnett
- Barnum effect (a.k.a. Forer effect) – Phineas Taylor Barnum (and Bertram R. Forer)
- Barton reaction – Derek Harold Richard Barton
- Barton–McCombie deoxygenation – Derek Harold Richard Barton and Stuart W. McCombie
- Baskerville effect – the fictional Charles Baskerville of the novel The Hound of the Baskervilles
- Batesian mimicry – Henry Walter Bates
- Bauschinger effect – Johann Bauschinger
- Bayes's theorem – Thomas Bayes
- Baylis–Hillman reaction – Anthony B. Baylis and Melville E. D. Hillman
- Bayliss effect – William M. Bayliss
- BCS superconduction theory – John Bardeen, Leon Cooper, and Robert Schrieffer
- Beaufort scale (Beaufort wind force scale) – Francis Beaufort
- Beckmann rearrangement – Ernst Otto Beckmann
- Beer's law (a.k.a. Beer–Lambert law or Beer–Lambert–Bouguer law) – August Beer (and Johann Heinrich Lambert and Pierre Bouguer)
- Beilstein's test – Friedrich Konrad Beilstein
- Bejan number – Adrian Bejan
- Bekenstein bound – Jacob Bekenstein
- Bélády's anomaly – László Bélády
- Bell's inequality – John Stewart Bell
- Bell number – Eric Temple Bell
- Belousov–Zhabotinskii reaction – Boris Pavlovich Belousov and Anatol Markovich Zhabotinskii
- Bénard cell – Henri Bénard
- Bénard–Marangoni cell/convection (a.k.a. Marangoni convection) – Henri Bénard and Carlo Marangoni
- Benedict's test – Stanley Rossiter Benedict
- Benford's law (a.k.a. Newcomb–Benford law) – Frank Albert Benford, Jr. (and Simon Newcomb)
- Benioff zone – see Wadati–Benioff zone, below
- Bennett pinch – Willard Harrison Bennett
- Berezinsky–Kosterlitz–Thouless transition – Veniamin L. Berezinsky, John M. Kosterlitz, and David J. Thouless
- Bergman cyclization – Robert George Bergman
- Bergmann's rule – Carl Bergmann (anatomist)
- Bergmann–Zervas carbobenzoxy method – Max Bergmann and Leonidas Zervas
- Bernoulli effect, Bernoulli's equation, principle – Daniel Bernoulli
- Berry's phase – Michael V. Berry
- Betz limit – Albert Betz
- Bezold–Brücke shift (a.k.a. von Bezold spreading effect) – Johann Friedrich Wilhelm von Bezold and Ernst Wilhelm von Brücke
- Biefeld–Brown effect – Paul Alfred Biefeld and Thomas Townsend Brown
- Biginelli reaction – Pietro Biginelli
- Biot number – Jean-Baptiste Biot
- Biot–Savart law – Jean-Baptiste Biot and Félix Savart
- Birch reduction – Arthur John Birch
- Birkeland currents – Kristian Birkeland
- Bischler–Napieralski reaction – August Bischler and Bernard Napieralski
- Black's equation for electromigration – James R. Black (d. 2004) of Motorola
- Blandford–Znajek process – Roger D. Blandford and Roman L. Znajek
- Blasius boundary layer, flow – Paul Richard Heinrich Blasius
- Blazhko effect – Sergey Blazhko
- Bloch electrons – Felix Bloch
- Bloom filter – Burton Howard Bloom
- Bodenstein number – Max Bodenstein
- Bohm sheath criterion – David Bohm
- Bohr effect – Christian Bohr
- Bohr magneton, model, radius – Niels Bohr
- Boltzmann constant – Ludwig Boltzmann
- Bonnor–Ebert mass – William Bowen Bonnor and Rolf Ebert
- Borel algebra, measure, set, space, summation, Borel's lemma, paradox – Émile Borel
- Borel–Cantelli lemma – Émile Borel and Francesco Paolo Cantelli
- Borel–Carathéodory theorem – Émile Borel and Constantin Carathéodory
- Born–Haber cycle – Max Born and Fritz Haber
- Born–Oppenheimer approximation – Max Born and Robert Oppenheimer
- Borodin–Hunsdiecker reaction – Alexander Borodin, Hienz Hunsdiecker, and Clare Hunsdiecker (née Dieckmann)
- Borrmann effect (a.k.a. Borrmann–Campbell effect) – Gerhard Borrman (and Herbert N. Campbell)
- Bortle scale – John E. Bortle
- Bose–Einstein condensate, effect, statistics – Satyendra Nath Bose and Albert Einstein
- Boson – Satyendra Nath Bose
- Boyer's law – Carl Benjamin Boyer
- Boyle's law (a.k.a. Boyle–Mariotte law) – Robert Boyle (and Edme Mariotte)
- Brackett line/series – Frederick Sumner Brackett
- Bradford's law (of scattering) – Samuel C. Bradford
- Braess's paradox – Dietrich Braess
- Bragg angle, Bragg's law, Bragg plane – William Henry Bragg and his son William Lawrence Bragg
- Bragg diffraction – William Lawrence Bragg
- Brans–Dicke theory – Carl H. Brans and Robert H. Dicke
- Bravais lattice – Auguste Bravais
- Bravais–Miller indices (a.k.a. Miller–Bravais indices) – Auguste Bravais and William Hallowes Miller
- Brayton cycle (a.k.a. Joule cycle) – George Bailey Brayton
- Bredt's rule – Julius Bredt
- Breit–Wheeler process – Gregory Breit and John A. Wheeler
- Brewster's angle, law – David Brewster
- Brillouin zone – Léon Brillouin
- Brinkman number – Hendrik C. Brinkman
- Brook rearrangement – Adrian Gibbs Brook
- Brooks's law (of software development) – Frederick Phillips Brooks, Jr.
- Brownian motion & Brown(ian) noise – Robert Brown
- Bucherer reaction – Hans Theodor Bucherer
- Büchi automata – Julius Richard Büchi
- Buckingham π theorem – Edgar Buckingham
- Burali-Forti paradox – Cesare Burali-Forti
- Bürgi–Dunitz angle – Hans-Beat Bürgi and Jack David Dunitz

== C ==
- Cabannes–Daure effect – Jean Cabannes and Pierre Daure
- Cadiot–Chodkiewicz coupling, reaction – Paul Cadiot and Wladyslav Chodkiewicz
- Callendar effect – Guy Stewart Callendar
- Callippic cycle – Callippus of Cyzicus
- Calvin cycle (a.k.a. Calvin–Benson cycle) – Melvin Calvin (and Andy Benson)
- Cannizzaro reaction – Stanislao Cannizzaro
- Cardan angles (a.k.a. Tait–Bryan angles) – Gerolamo Cardano
- Carnot cycle, number – Nicolas Léonard Sadi Carnot
- Carpenter effect (a.k.a. Ideomotor effect) – William Benjamin Carpenter
- Cartan–Kähler theorem – Élie Cartan, Erich Kähler
- Casimir effect – Hendrik Casimir
- Catalan's conjecture (a.k.a. Mihăilescu's theorem), Catalan numbers – Eugène Charles Catalan
- Cauchy number (a.k.a. Hooke number) – Augustin-Louis Cauchy
- Cauchy–Kovalevskaya theorem – Augustin-Louis Cauchy, Sofia Kovalevskaya
- Cauer filter – Wilhelm Cauer
- Chandler wobble – Seth Carlo Chandler
- Chandrasekhar limit, number – Subrahmanyan Chandrasekhar
- Chang–Refsdal lens – Kyongae Chang and Sjur Refsdal
- Chaplygin gas – Sergey Alexeyevich Chaplygin
- Charles's law – Jacques Charles
- Chebyshev distance, equation, filter, linkage, polynomials – Pafnuty Chebyshev
- Chebyshev's inequality (a.k.a. Bienaymé–Chebyshev inequality) – Pafnuty Chebyshev (and Irénée-Jules Bienaymé)
- Cherenkov radiation (a.k.a. Cherenkov–Vavilov radiation) – Pavel Alekseyevich Cherenkov (and Sergey Ivanovich Vavilov)
- Chichibabin reaction – Alexei Yevgenievich Chichibabin
- Christiansen effect – Christian Christiansen
- Christoffel symbol – Elwin Bruno Christoffel
- Christofilos effect – Nicholas Christofilos
- Chugaev elimination/reaction, reagent – Lev Aleksandrovich Chugaev
- Chwolson ring or Chwolson–Einstein ring – Orest Khvolson (and Albert Einstein)
- Clairaut's relation, theorem – Alexis Claude Clairaut
- Claisen condensation, rearrangement – Rainer Ludwig Claisen
- Claisen–Schmidt condensation – Rainer Ludwig Claisen and J. Gustav Schmidt
- Clapp oscillator – James K. Clapp
- Clarke orbit – Arthur C. Clarke
- Clemmensen reduction – Erik Christian Clemmensen
- Coanda effect – Henri Coanda
- Coase theorem – Ronald Coase
- Colburn–Chilton analogy (a.k.a. Colburn analogy) – Allan Philip Colburn and Thomas H. Chilton
- Coleman–Liau index – Meri Coleman and T. L. Liau
- Coleman–Mandula theorem – Sidney Coleman and Jeffrey Mandula
- Collatz conjecture (a.k.a. the Ulam conjecture (Stanisław Ulam), Kakutani's problem (Shizuo Kakutani), the Thwaites conjecture (Sir Bryan Thwaites), Hasse's algorithm (Helmut Hasse), the Syracuse problem) – Lothar Collatz
- Colpitts oscillator – Edwin H. Colpitts
- Compton effect, scattering, wavelength – Arthur Compton
- Compton–Getting effect – Arthur Compton and Ivan A. Getting
- Conway's base 13 function – John H. Conway
- Coolidge effect – from a joke attributed to John Calvin Coolidge, Jr.
- Cooper pair – Leon Cooper
- Cope elimination, rearrangement – Arthur Clay Cope
- Corey–Fuchs reaction – Elias James Corey and Philip L. Fuchs
- Corey–Kim oxidation – Elias James Corey and Choung Un Kim
- Corey–Winter olefin synthesis – Elias James Corey and Roland Arthur Edwin Winter
- Coriolis effect – Gaspard-Gustave Coriolis
- Cotton effect – Aimé Auguste Cotton
- Cotton–Mouton effect – Aimé Auguste Cotton and Henri Mouton
- Coulomb's law – Charles Augustin de Coulomb
- Coulter counter, principle – Wallace Henry Coulter
- Coxeter–Dynkin diagram – Harold Scott MacDonald Coxeter and Eugene Borisovich Dynkin
- Crabtree effect – Herbert Grace Crabtree
- Criegee reaction, rearrangement – Rudolf Criegee
- Curie law, Curie–Weiss law – Pierre Curie (and Pierre Weiss)
- Curie point – Pierre Curie
- Curry's paradox – Haskell Curry
- Curtin–Hammett principle – David Yarrow Curtin and Louis Plack Hammett
- Curtius rearrangement – Theodor Curtius

== D ==
- Dakin reaction – Henry Drysdale Dakin
- Dakin–West reaction – Henry Drysdale Dakin and Randolph West
- Dalton's law (of partial pressures) – John Dalton
- Damerau–Levenshtein distance – Frederick J. Damerau and Vladimir Levenshtein
- Darboux function – Jean Gaston Darboux
- Darcy's law – Henry Darcy
- Darlington pair – Sidney Darlington
- Darwin drift – Charles Galton Darwin
- Darwin point, Darwinism – Charles Darwin
- Darzens condensation – Auguste Georges Darzens
- Davies–Bouldin index (DBI) – David L. Davies and Donald W. Bouldin
- de Broglie wavelength – Louis de Broglie
- de Bruijn sequences – Nicolaas Govert de Bruijn
- de Haas–van Alphen effect – Wander Johannes de Haas and Pieter M. van Alphen
- de Haas–Shubnikov effect – see Shubnikov–de Haas effect, below
- Deborah number – the prophetess Deborah (Bible, Judges 5:5)
- Debye model – Peter Joseph William Debye
- Debye–Falkenhagen effect – Peter Joseph William Debye and Hans Falkenhagen
- Richard Dedekind has many topics named after him; see biography article.
- Delbrück scattering – Max Ludwig Henning Delbrück
- Delépine reaction – Stéphane Marcel Delépine
- Dellinger effect (a.k.a. Mögel–Dellinger effect) – John Howard Dellinger (and Hans Mögel)
- Demjanov rearrangement – Nikolai Jakovlevich Demjanov
- Dermott's law – Stanley Dermott
- Dess–Martin oxidation – Daniel Benjamin Dess and James Cullen Martin
- DeVries solar cycle – See Suess solar cycle, below
- Dice's coefficient – Lee Raymond Dice
- Dieckmann condensation – Walter Dieckmann
- Diels–Alder reaction – Otto Paul Hermann Diels and Kurt Alder
- Diophantine equation – Diophantus of Alexandria
- Dirac comb, fermion, spinor, equation, delta function, measure – Paul Dirac
- Peter Gustav Lejeune Dirichlet has dozens of formulas named after him, see List of things named after Peter Gustav Lejeune Dirichlet
- Divisia index – François Divisia
- Doebner–Miller reaction – Oscar Döbner (Doebner) and Wilhelm von Miller
- Dollo's law – Louis Dollo
- Donnan effect (a.k.a. Gibbs–Donnan effect) – see Gibbs–Donnan effect, below
- Doppler effect (a.k.a. Doppler–Fizeau effect), Doppler profile – Christian Doppler (and Hippolyte Fizeau)
- Downs–Thomson paradox – Anthony Downs and John Michael Thomson
- Drake equation (a.k.a. Sagan equation, Green Bank equation) – Frank Drake (or Carl Sagan or Green Bank, West Virginia, home to the National Radio Astronomy Observatory (NRAO))
- Droste effect – Dutch chocolate maker Droste
- Drude model – Paul Drude
- Duff's device – Tom Duff
- Duffing equation, map – Georg Duffing
- Duhamel's integral, and principle – Jean-Marie Constant Duhamel
- Dulong–Petit law – Pierre Louis Dulong and Alexis Thérèse Petit
- Dunitz angle – see Bürgi–Dunitz angle, above
- Dunning–Kruger effect – David Dunning and Justin Kruger
- Dyson–Harrop satellite – Brooks L. Harrop and Freeman Dyson

== E ==
- Early effect – James M. Early
- Eddington limit – Arthur Eddington
- Edgeworth–Bowley box – Francis Ysidro Edgeworth and Arthur Lyon Bowley
- Edison effect – Thomas Edison
- Edman degradation – Pehr Victor Edman
- Edward–Lemieux effect (a.k.a. Anomeric effect) – John Thomas Edward and Raymond U. Lemieux
- Eglinton reaction – Geoffrey Eglinton
- Ehrenfest paradox – Paul Ehrenfest
- Eimer's organ – Gustav Heinrich Theodor Eimer
- Einstein Cross, effect, radius, ring, shift – Albert Einstein
- Einstein–Chwolson ring or Chwolson ring – Albert Einstein and Orest Khvolson
- Einstein–de Haas effect – Albert Einstein and Wander Johannes de Haas
- Einstein–Podolsky–Rosen paradox (a.k.a. EPR paradox, Einstein–Podolsky–Rosen–Bohm paradox) – Albert Einstein, Boris Podolsky, Nathan Rosen (and David Bohm)
- Ekman layer – Walfrid Ekman
- Elbs reaction – Karl Elbs
- Elliott–Halberstam conjecture – Peter D. T. A. Elliott and Heini Halberstam
- Elman network – Jeff Elman
- Elsasser number – Walter M. Elsasser
- Engel curve – Ernst Engel
- Engelbart's law – Douglas Engelbart
- Epimenides paradox – Epimenides of Knossos
- Erlenmeyer flask, rule, synthesis – Richard August Carl Emil Erlenmeyer
- Eschenmoser fragmentation – Albert Eschenmoser
- Eschweiler–Clarke reaction – Wilhelm Eschweiler and Hans Thacher Clarke
- Eshelby's inclusion – John D. Eshelby
- Étard reaction – Alexandre Léon Étard
- Ettingshausen effect – Albert von Ettingshausen
- Euler this and that (numerous entries) – Leonhard Euler
- Evershed effect – John Evershed

== F ==
- Faà di Bruno's formula – Francesco Faà di Bruno
- Faraday constant, effect, Faraday's law of induction, Faraday's law of electrolysis – Michael Faraday
- Farnsworth–Hirsch fusor – Philo T. Farnsworth and Robert L. Hirsch
- Favorskii reaction, rearrangement – Alexei Yevgrafovich Favorskii
- Fenton reaction – Henry John Horstman Fenton
- Fermat's principle – Pierre de Fermat
- Fermi energy, paradox, surface, Fermion – Enrico Fermi
- Fermi–Dirac statistics – Enrico Fermi and Paul Dirac
- Ferrel cell – William Ferrel
- Ferrers diagram (a.k.a. Young diagram, Ferrers graph) – Norman Macleod Ferrers
- Feshbach resonance – Herman Feshbach
- Feynman diagram – Richard Feynman
- Finkelstein reaction – Hans Finkelstein
- Fischer esterification, indole synthesis – Emil Hermann Fischer
- Fischer–Hafner reaction – Ernst Otto Fischer and Walter Hafner
- Fischer–Tropsch process – Franz Joseph Emil Fischer and Hans Tropsch
- Fischer–Hepp rearrangement – Otto Philipp Fischer and Eduard Hepp
- Fisher distribution – Ronald A. Fisher
- Fisher equation – Irving Fisher
- Fisher–Widom line – Michael E. Fisher and Benjamin Widom
- Fitts's law – Paul M. Fitts
- Flesch–Kincaid readability test – Rudolf F. Flesch and J. Peter Kincaid
- Fletcher–Munson curves – Harvey Fletcher and Wilden A. Munson
- Flynn effect – Jim Flynn
- Föppl–von Kármán equations – August Föppl and Theodore von Kármán
- Forbush effect – Scott Ellsworth Forbush
- Forer effect (a.k.a. Barnum effect) – Bertram R. Forer (and Phineas Taylor Barnum)
- Foucault pendulum – Jean Bernard Léon Foucault
- Fourier number – Joseph Fourier
- Fourier series – Joseph Fourier
- Fourier–Motzkin elimination – Joseph Fourier and Theodore Motzkin
- Franck–Condon principle – James Franck and Edward Uhler Condon
- Franssen effect – Nico Franssen
- Franz–Keldysh effect – Walter Franz and Leonid V. Keldysh
- Fraunhofer diffraction, lines – Joseph von Fraunhofer
- Freeman law – Ken Freeman
- Frenkel line – Jacov Frenkel
- Fresnel zone – Augustin Fresnel
- Frey effect – Allan H. Frey
- Friedel oscillations – Jacques Friedel
- Friedel–Crafts reaction – Charles Friedel and James Mason Crafts
- Friedländer synthesis – Paul Friedländer
- Friedmann–Lemaître–Robertson–Walker metric (a.k.a. Friedmann–Robertson–Walker metric, Robertson–Walker metric) – Alexander Friedmann, Georges Lemaître, Howard P. Robertson and Arthur Geoffrey Walker
- Fries and photo-Fries rearrangement – Karl Theophil Fries
- Fritsch–Buttenberg–Wiechell rearrangement – Paul Ernst Moritz Fritsch, Wilhelm Paul Buttenberg, and Heinrich G. Wiechell
- Frobenius algebra, automorphism, method, norm, theorem – Ferdinand Georg Frobenius
- Froude number – William Froude
- Fry readability formula – Edward Fry
- Fujita scale (a.k.a. F-Scale, Fujita–Pearson scale) – Tetsuya Theodore Fujita (and Allen Pearson)
- Fujiwhara effect – Sakuhei Fujiwhara

== G ==
- Gabriel synthesis – Siegmund Gabriel
- Gardner transition – Elizabeth Gardner
- Garman limit – Elspeth Garman
- Gattermann reaction – Ludwig Gattermann
- Gattermann–Koch reaction – Ludwig Gattermann and Julius Arnold Koch
- Gaunt factor (or Kramers–Gaunt factor) – John Arthur Gaunt (and Hendrik Anthony Kramers)
- Gause's principle – Georgii Gause
- Gauss's law – Carl Friedrich Gauss
- Gauss–Bonnet gravity, theorem – Carl Friedrich Gauss and Pierre Ossian Bonnet
- Geib–Spevack process (a.k.a. Girdler sulfide (GS) process) – Karl-Hermann Geib and Jerome S. Spevack (and the Girdler company, which built the first American plant using the process)
- Geiger counter (a.k.a. Geiger–Müller counter) – Johannes Wilhelm (Hans) Geiger (and Walther Müller)
- Geiger–Marsden experiment (a.k.a. Rutherford experiment) – Johannes Wilhelm (Hans) Geiger and Ernest Marsden
- Geiger–Müller tube – Johannes Wilhelm (Hans) Geiger and Walther Müller
- Geiger–Nuttall law/rule – Johannes Wilhelm (Hans) Geiger and John Mitchell Nuttall
- Geissler tube – Heinrich Geissler
- Gibbs entropy, free energy, paradox, Gibbs's phase rule, Gibbs phenomenon – Josiah Willard Gibbs
- Gibbs–Donnan effect (a.k.a. Donnan effect) – Josiah Willard Gibbs and Frederick G. Donnan
- Gibbs–Marangoni effect (a.k.a. Marangoni effect) – Josiah Willard Gibbs and Carlo Marangoni
- Gibbs–Helmholtz equation – Josiah Willard Gibbs and Hermann von Helmholtz
- Gibbs–Thomson effect – Josiah Willard Gibbs and three Thomsons: James Thomson, William Thomson, 1st Baron Kelvin, Joseph John "J. J." Thomson
- Giffen good – Robert Giffen
- Gleissberg solar cycle – Wolfgang Gleißberg
- Gloger's rule – Constantin Wilhelm Lambert Gloger
- Goldbach's conjecture – Christian Goldbach
- Goldstone boson (a.k.a. Nambu–Goldstone boson) – see Nambu–Goldstone boson, below
- Gomberg–Bachmann reaction – Moses Gomberg and Werner Emmanuel Bachmann
- Goodhart's law – Charles Goodhart
- Goos–Hänchen effect or shift – Fritz Goos and Hilda Hänchen
- Gould Belt – Benjamin Gould
- Grashof number – Franz Grashof
- Greisen–Zatsepin–Kuzmin cut-off/limit (a.k.a. GZK cutoff/limit) – Kenneth Greisen, Georgiy Zatsepin and Vadim Kuzmin
- Gresham's law – Thomas Gresham
- Griess test (diazotization reaction) – Johann Peter Griess
- Grignard reaction – François Auguste Victor Grignard
- Grob fragmentation – Cyril A. Grob
- Gromov–Witten invariant – Mikhail Gromov and Edward Witten
- Grosch's law – Herbert Reuben John Grosch
- Grotrian diagram – Walter Robert Wilhelm Grotrian
- Grotthuss chain – Christian Johann Dietrich Theodor von Grotthuss
- Grotthuss–Draper law – Christian Johann Dietrich Theodor von Grotthuss and John William Draper
- Gunn diode, effect – John Battiscombe "J. B." Gunn
- Gunning fog index – Robert Gunning
- Gustafson's law, a.k.a. Gustafson–Barsis's law – John L. Gustafson (and Edward H. Barsis)
- Gutenberg–Richter law – Beno Gutenberg and Charles Francis Richter

== H ==
- Haar measure – Alfréd Haar
- Hadamard inequality – Jacques Solomon Hadamard
- Hadamard transform (a.k.a. Hadamard–Rademacher–Walsh transform) – Jacques Hadamard, Hans Rademacher, and Joseph L. Walsh
- Hadley cell – George Hadley
- Hagedorn temperature – Rolf Hagedorn
- Haitz's law – Roland Haitz
- Haldane effect – John Scott Haldane
- Haldane's principle – John Burdon Sanderson Haldane
- Hale solar cycle – George Ellery Hale
- Hall effect – Edwin Hall
- Hamilton's rule – William Donald "Bill" Hamilton
- Hamming code, Hamming distance, Hamming weight – Richard Hamming
- Hammond postulate – George Simms Hammond
- Hanle effect – Wilhelm Hanle
- Hardy notation, space – Godfrey Harold Hardy
- Hardy–Littlewood circle method, first conjecture – Godfrey Harold Hardy and John E. Littlewood
- Hardy–Weinberg principle – Wilhelm Weinberg and Godfrey Harold Hardy
- Harrod–Johnson diagram – Roy F. Harrod and Harry G. Johnson
- Hartley oscillator – Ralph Hartley
- Hartman effect – Thomas E. Hartman
- Hartmann mask (or hat) – Johannes Hartmann
- Hartree energy – Douglas Hartree
- Hasse's algorithm – see Collatz conjecture, above
- Hasse diagram, principle – Helmut Hasse
- Hasse–Minkowski theorem – Helmut Hasse and Hermann Minkowski
- Hausdorff dimension – Felix Hausdorff
- Hawthorne effect – from the Hawthorne Works factory (where experiments were carried out 1924–1932)
- Hayashi track – Chushiro Hayashi
- Hayflick limit – Leonard Hayflick
- Hawking radiation (a.k.a. Bekenstein–Hawking radiation) – Stephen Hawking (and Jacob Bekenstein)
- Heaps's law (a.k.a. Herdan's law, Herdan–Heaps law) – Harold Stanley Heaps (and Gustav Herdan)
- Heaviside layer – see Kennelly–Heaviside layer
- Hebbian learning – Donald Olding Hebb
- Heine–Borel theorem – Heinrich Eduard Heine and Émile Borel
- Heinlein's razor – see Hanlon's razor, above
- Heisenberg uncertainty principle – Werner Heisenberg
- Hellmann–Feynman theorem – Hans Hellmann and Richard Feynman
- Helmholtz free energy, Helmholtz resonance – Hermann von Helmholtz
- Hénon map – Michel Hénon
- Hénon–Heiles system, potential – Michel Hénon and Carl E. Heiles
- Henrietta's law – see Leavitt's law, below
- Henyey track – Louis G. Henyey
- Herbig Ae/Be star – George Herbig
- Herbig–Haro object – George Herbig and Guillermo Haro
- Herbrand base, interpretation, structure, universe, and Herbrand's theorem – Jacques Herbrand
- Hertz effect – Heinrich Rudolf Hertz
- Hertzsprung–Russell diagram – Ejnar Hertzsprung and Henry Norris Russell
- Hess afterimage – Carl von Hess
- Hess diagram – R. Hess
- Heusler alloy – Fritz Heusler
- Heyting algebra, arithmetic – Arend Heyting
- Hick's law, a.k.a. Hick–Hyman law – William Edmund Hick and Ray Hyman
- Higgs boson, field – Peter Higgs
- Higgs mechanism – see Anderson–Higgs mechanism, above
- Hilbert–Waring theorem (a.k.a. Waring's problem) – David Hilbert and Edward Waring
- Hill sphere (a.k.a. Roche sphere) – George William Hill (and Édouard Roche)
- Hills cloud – Jack G. Hills
- Hipparchic cycle – Hipparchus of Nicaea (a.k.a. Hipparchus of Rhodes)
- Hirayama family – Kiyotsugu Hirayama
- Hirsch–Meeks fusor – Robert L. Hirsch and Gene A. Meeks
- Hofstadter's butterfly, law – Douglas Hofstadter
- Hopfield dielectric – John J. Hopfield
- Hopfield network – John J. Hopfield
- Hopkinson effect – John Hopkinson
- Hořava–Lifshitz gravity – Petr Hořava and Evgeny Lifshitz
- Hořava–Witten domain wall – Petr Hořava and Edward Witten
- Hubbert peak – Marion King Hubbert
- Hubble constant, expansion – Edwin Hubble
- Hubble–Reynolds law – Edwin Hubble and John Henry Reynolds
- Huchra's Lens – John Huchra
- Humphreys line/series – Curtis J. Humphreys
- Hund's Rules – Friedrich Hund
- Hunsdiecker reaction – Heinz Hunsdiecker and Cläre Hunsdiecker
- Huygens–Fresnel principle – Christiaan Huygens and Augustin-Jean Fresnel

== I ==
- Imbert–Fedorov effect – Christian Imbert and Fedor Ivanovič Fedorov
- Ishikawa diagram – Kaoru Ishikawa
- Ising model (a.k.a. Lenz–Ising model) – Ernst Ising (and Wilhelm Lenz)

== J ==
- Jaccard index, similarity coefficient, distance – Paul Jaccard
- Jaffe profile (or model) – Walter Jaffe
- Jahn–Teller effect – Hermann Arthur Jahn and Edward Teller
- Jaro–Winkler distance – Matthew A. Jaro and William E. Winkler
- Jarque–Bera test – Carlos M. Jarque and Anil K. Bera
- Jeans’s theorem – James Hopwood Jeans
- Johnson–Nyquist noise – John B. Johnson and Harry Nyquist
- Jordan’s rule/law – David Starr Jordan
- Josephson constant, effect, junction – Brian David Josephson
- Joule cycle (a.k.a. Brayton cycle) – James Prescott Joule
- Joule’s law (a.k.a. Joule–Lenz law) – James Prescott Joule and Heinrich Friedrich Emil Lenz
- Joule–Thomson effect (a.k.a. Joule–Kelvin effect) – James Prescott Joule and William Thomson, 1st Baron Kelvin

== K ==
- K3 surface – Ernst Kummer, Erich Kähler, Kunihiko Kodaira
- Kähler differential, manifold, metric – Erich Kähler
- Kakutani's problem – see Collatz conjecture, above
- Kármán vortex street – Theodore von Kármán
- Karnaugh map (a.k.a. Karnaugh–Veitch map, Veitch diagram) – Maurice Karnaugh (and Edward W. Veitch)
- Karush–Kuhn–Tucker conditions (a.k.a. Kuhn–Tucker conditions) – William Karush, Harold W. Kuhn and Albert W. Tucker
- Kasha's rule – Michael Kasha
- Kater's pendulum – Captain Henry Kater
- Kaye effect – Alan Kaye
- Keeling Curve – Charles David Keeling
- Kelvin wave – William Thomson, 1st Baron Kelvin
- Kelvin–Helmholtz mechanism, instability – William Thomson, 1st Baron Kelvin and Hermann von Helmholtz
- Kelvin–Joule effect (a.k.a. Joule–Thomson effect) – William Thomson, 1st Baron Kelvin and James Prescott Joule
- Kelvin–Voigt material, model – Woldemar Voigt and William Thomson, 1st Baron Kelvin
- Kennelly–Heaviside layer – Arthur Edwin Kennelly and Oliver Heaviside
- Kennicutt–Schmidt law (a.k.a. Schmidt–Kennicutt law, or Schmidt law) – Maarten Schmidt and Robert Kennicutt
- Kepler's laws of planetary motion – Johannes Kepler
- Kerr effect – John Kerr
- Kirkendall effect – Ernest Kirkendall
- Kleene star (a.k.a. Kleene operator, Kleene closure) – Stephen Kleene
- Klein–Gordon equation – Oskar Klein and Walter Gordon
- Klein–Nishina effect – Oskar Klein and Yoshio Nishina
- Knudsen cell, number – Martin Hans Christian Knudsen
- Kodaira dimension, embedding theorem, vanishing theorem – Kunihiko Kodaira
- Koenigs–Knorr reaction – Wilhelm Koenigs and Edward Knorr
- Kohn effect – Walter Kohn
- Kohn–Sham equations – Walter Kohn and Lu Jeu Sham
- Kohonen network – Teuvo Kohonen
- Kolakoski sequence – William Kolakoski
- Kolbe electrolysis – Adolph Wilhelm Hermann Kolbe
- Kolbe–Schmitt reaction – Adolph Wilhelm Hermann Kolbe and Rudolf Schmitt
- Kondo effect – Jun Kondo
- Kornblum oxidation – Nathan Kornblum
- Kornblum–DeLaMare rearrangement – Nathan Kornblum and Harold E. DeLaMare
- Kossel effect – Walther Kossel
- Kosterlitz–Thouless transition – see Berezinsky–Kosterlitz–Thouless transition, above
- Kozai effect – Yoshihide Kozai
- Krebs cycle – Hans Adolf Krebs
- Kratzer potential – Adolf Kratzer
- Kronecker delta – Leopold Kronecker
- Kuhn–Tucker conditions – see Karush–Kuhn–Tucker conditions, above
- Kuiper belt – Gerard Kuiper
- Kummer's function, Kummer surface – Ernst Kummer
- Kuramoto model – Yoshiki Kuramoto

== L ==
- Lagrangian mechanics, Lagrange points – Joseph-Louis Lagrange
- Lamb shift – Willis Lamb
- Lambert's cosine law (a.k.a. Lambert's emission law) – Johann Heinrich Lambert
- Landau damping, pole – Lev Davidovich Landau
- Landau–Pomeranchuk–Migdal effect – Lev Davidovich Landau, Isaak Pomeranchuk, and Arkady Migdal
- Landau–Zener transition – Lev Davidovich Landau and Clarence Zener
- Landé g-factor – Alfred Landé
- Langmuir probe – Irving Langmuir
- Langmuir–Blodgett film – Irving Langmuir and Katharine B. Blodgett
- Laplace vector – see Laplace–Runge–Lenz vector, below
- Laplace–Runge–Lenz vector (a.k.a. LRL vector, Laplace vector, Runge–Lenz vector, Lenz vector) – Pierre-Simon de Laplace, Carl Runge and Wilhelm Lenz
- Larmor frequency, precession, radius – Joseph Larmor
- Larsen effect – Søren Absalon Larsen
- Laspeyres index – Ernst Louis Etienne Laspeyres
- Leavitt's law (a.k.a. Henrietta's law) – Henrietta Swan Leavitt
- Le Chatelier's principle – Henri Louis Le Chatelier
- Lee distance – C. Y. Lee
- Leidenfrost effect, point – Johann Gottlob Leidenfrost
- Lenard effect – Philipp Eduard Anton von Lenard
- Lennard-Jones potential – John Lennard-Jones
- Lense–Thirring effect (a.k.a. Thirring effect) – Josef Lense and Hans Thirring
- Lenz vector – see Laplace–Runge–Lenz vector, above
- Lenz's law – Heinrich Friedrich Emil Lenz
- Leonard–Merritt mass estimator – Peter Leonard and David Merritt
- Levenshtein distance, automaton – Vladimir Levenshtein
- Levi-Civita symbol – Tullio Levi-Civita
- Lewis–Mogridge Position – David Lewis and Martin J. H. Mogridge
- Little–Parks effect – William A. Little and Roland D. Parks
- Littlewood–Offord problem – John E. Littlewood and A. Cyril Offord
- Locard's exchange principle – Edmond Locard
- Lode angle, Lode coordinates – Walter Lode
- Lombard effect – Étienne Lombard
- London force – Fritz London
- Lorentz force, transformation – Hendrik Antoon Lorentz
- Lorentz–Lorenz equation – Hendrik Antoon Lorentz and Ludvig Lorenz
- Lorenz attractor – Edward Norton Lorenz
- Lorenz curve – Max O. Lorenz
- Lorenz gauge condition – Ludvig Lorenz
- Lorenz–Mie scattering – see Mie scattering, below
- Loschmidt's paradox – Johann Josef Loschmidt
- Lotka's law – Alfred J. Lotka
- Lotka–Volterra equation – Alfred J. Lotka and Vito Volterra
- Love waves – Augustus Edward Hough Love
- Lucas critique – Robert Lucas, Jr.
- Lyapunov's central limit theorem, equation, exponent, fractal, function, stability, test, time and tube – Aleksandr Mikhailovich Lyapunov
- Lyman line, series – Theodore Lyman

== M ==
- Mach band/effect, number, principle – Ernst Mach
- Mach–Zehnder interferometer – Ludwig Mach and Ludwig Zehnder
- Madelung constant, rule, energy – Erwin Madelung
- Maggi–Righi–Leduc effect (Thermal Hall effect) – Gian Antonio Maggi, Augusto Righi and Sylvestre Anatole Leduc
- Magnus effect – Heinrich Gustav Magnus
- Magorrian relation – John Magorrian
- Mahalanobis distance – Prasanta Chandra Mahalanobis (প্রশান্ত চন্দ্র মহলানবিস)
- Mahler measure, Mahler's theorem – Kurt Mahler
- Maillard reaction
- Malmquist bias, effect – Karl Gunnar Malmquist
- Malus's law – Étienne-Louis Malus
- Malthusian parameter – named by Ronald Fisher as a criticism of Thomas Robert Malthus
- Malthusian catastrophe, growth model – Thomas Robert Malthus
- Marangoni cell/convection (a.k.a. Bénard–Marangoni convection) – see Bénard–Marangoni cell/convection, above
- Marangoni effect (a.k.a. Gibbs–Marangoni effect) – see Gibbs–Marangoni effect, above
- Markov's inequality, chain, partition, Markovian process – Andrey Markov
- Mathieu functions – Émile Léonard Mathieu
- Matilda effect – Matilda Joslyn Gage
- Matthew effect – Matthew the Evangelist
- Maxwell–Boltzmann distribution – James Clerk Maxwell and Ludwig Boltzmann
- McCollough effect – Celeste McCollough
- McCulloch–Pitts neuron – Warren McCulloch and Walter Pitts
- McGurk effect (a.k.a. McGurk–MacDonald effect) – Harry McGurk (and John MacDonald)
- Mealy machine – George H. Mealy
- Meissner effect (a.k.a. Meissner–Ochsenfeld effect) – Walther Meissner (and Robert Ochsenfeld)
- Mendelian inheritance – Gregor Mendel
- Menzerath's law (a.k.a. Menzerath–Altmann law) – Paul Menzerath (and Gabriel Altmann)
- Mercalli intensity scale (Modified Mercalli scale) – Giuseppe Mercalli
- Metonic cycle – Meton of Athens
- Meyers synthesis – Albert I. Meyers
- Mie scattering (a.k.a. Lorenz–Mie scattering) – Gustav Mie (and Ludvig Lorenz)
- Mihăilescu's theorem (a.k.a. Catalan's conjecture) – Preda Mihăilescu
- Mikheyev–Smirnov–Wolfenstein effect – Stanislav Mikheyev, Alexei Smirnov, and Lincoln Wolfenstein
- Miller effect – John Milton Miller
- Miller indices (a.k.a. Miller–Bravais indices) – William Hallowes Miller (and Auguste Bravais)
- Misnay–Schardin effect – Col. József Misnay and Hubert Schardin
- Mögel–Dellinger effect – see Dellinger effect, above
- Mohorovičić discontinuity (Moho) – Andrija Mohorovičić
- Mohr's circle – Christian Otto Mohr
- Mohr–Coulomb theory – Christian Otto Mohr and Charles-Augustin de Coulomb
- Mooers's law – Calvin Mooers
- Moore machine – Edward Forrest Moore
- Moore's law – Gordon E. Moore
- Morgan unit – Thomas Hunt Morgan
- Moreton wave – Gail E. Moreton
- Morse potential – Philip M. Morse
- Moses effect – after biblical Moses
- Mössbauer effect – Rudolf Mössbauer
- Mott cross section, Mott insulator, Mott transition – Nevill Francis Mott
- Mould effect (Chain fountain) – Steve Mould
- Mpemba effect – Erasto B. Mpemba
- Müllerian mimicry – Fritz Müller
- Munroe effect – Charles Edward Munroe
- Muraour's law – Henri Muraour (1880–1954)
- Murphy's law – Maj. Edward A. Murphy, Jr.

== N ==
- Nambu–Goldstone boson (a.k.a. Goldstone boson) – Yoichiro Nambu and Jeffrey Goldstone
- Nash equilibrium – John Forbes Nash
- Nassi–Shneiderman diagram – Isaac Nassi and Ben Shneiderman
- Necker cube – Louis Albert Necker
- Needleman–Wunsch algorithm – Saul B. Needleman and Christian D. Wunsch
- Néel temperature – Louis Néel
- Nernst effect (a.k.a. Nernst–Ettingshausen effect) – Walther Hermann Nernst and Albert von Ettingshausen
- Nernst equation – Walther Hermann Nernst
- Neupert effect – Werner Neupert
- Newcomb's paradox – William Newcomb
- Newton's rings, Newtonian constant of gravitation, mechanics – Isaac Newton
- Noether's theorem – Emmy Noether
- Nordtvedt effect – Kenneth L. Nordtvedt
- Nyquist frequency, Nyquist rate – Harry Nyquist
- Nyquist–Shannon sampling theorem (a.k.a. Nyquist–Shannon–Kotelnikov, Whittaker–Shannon–Kotelnikov, Whittaker–Nyquist–Kotelnikov–Shannon, WKS theorem) – Harry Nyquist, Claude Shannon, Edmund Taylor Whittaker, and Vladimir Kotelnikov

== O ==
- Oberth effect – Hermann Oberth
- O'Connell effect – Daniel Joseph Kelly O'Connell
- Olbers's paradox – Heinrich Wilhelm Olbers
- Ohm's law – Georg Ohm
- Okun's law – Arthur Okun
- Omori's law – Fusakichi Omori
- Onnes effect – Heike Kamerlingh Onnes
- Oort cloud (a.k.a. Öpik–Oort cloud) – Jan Hendrik Oort (and Ernst Julius Öpik)
- Ostriker–Peebles criterion – Jeremiah P. Ostriker and Jim Peebles
- Ostwald's dilution law, Ostwald process – Friedrich Wilhelm Ostwald
- Overhauser effect – Albert Overhauser
- Ovshinsky effect – Stanford R. Ovshinsky

== P ==
- Paal–Knorr synthesis – Carl Paal and Ludwig Knorr
- Pareto chart, distribution, efficiency, index, principle – Vilfredo Federico Damaso Pareto
- Pareto–Zipf law (a.k.a. Zipf–Mandelbrot law) – Vilfredo Pareto and George K. Zipf (or Benoît Mandelbrot)
- Parrondo's games, paradox – Juan Manuel Rodríguez Parrondo
- Paschen curve, line, law – Friedrich Paschen
- Paschen–Back effect – Friedrich Paschen and Ernst Back
- Pasteur effect – Louis Pasteur
- Paternò–Büchi reaction – Emanuele Paternò and George Büchi
- Pauli exclusion principle – Wolfgang Pauli
- Peano curve – Giuseppe Peano
- Pearson–Anson effect – Stephen Oswald Pearson and Horatio Saint George Anson
- Péclet number – Jean Claude Eugène Péclet
- Peltier effect – Jean Charles Athanase Peltier
- Perlin noise – Ken Perlin
- Perron–Frobenius theorem – Oskar Perron, and Ferdinand Georg Frobenius
- Petkau effect – Abram Petkau
- Petri dish – Julius Richard Petri
- Petri net – Carl Adam Petri
- Peyer's patches – Johann Conrad Peyer
- Pfeiffer effect – Paul Pfeiffer
- Pfund line/series – August Herman Pfund
- Phillips curve – William Phillips (economist)
- Pigou effect – Arthur Cecil Pigou
- Piobert's law – Guillaume Piobert (1793–1871)
- Pisot–Vijayaraghavan number – Charles Pisot and Tirukkannapuram Vijayaraghavan
- Planck constant, length, mass, time – Max Planck
- Platonic year – Plato
- Pockels effect – Friedrich Carl Alwin Pockels
- Pogson ratio – Norman Robert Pogson
- Poincaré map, section – Henri Poincaré
- Poincaré–Bendixson theorem – Henri Poincaré and Ivar Otto Bendixson
- Poinsot's spirals – Louis Poinsot
- Polchinski's paradox – Joseph Polchinski
- Potts model (a.k.a. Ashkin–Teller model) – Renfrey B. Potts, Julius Ashkin, and Edward Teller
- Pourbaix diagram – Marcel Pourbaix
- Poynting effect, vector – John Henry Poynting
- Poynting–Robertson effect – John Henry Poynting and Howard P. Robertson
- Prandtl number – Ludwig Prandtl
- Primakoff effect – Henry Primakoff
- Proteus phenomenon – Proteus (mythological god)
- Pulfrich effect – Carl P. Pulfrich
- Purkinje effect/shift – Johannes Evangelista Purkinje
- Pygmalion effect (a.k.a. Rosenthal effect, observer-expectancy effect) – Pygmalion (and Robert Rosenthal)
- Pythagorean theorem (a.k.a. Pythagoras's theorem) – Pythagoras

== R ==
- Rabi oscillations – Isidor Isaac Rabi
- Rademacher distribution, function, series, sum – Hans Adolph Rademacher
- Rademacher–Menchov theorem – Hans Adolph Rademacher and Dmitrii Menshov
- Radon transform – Johann Karl August Radon
- Raman scattering – Chandrasekhara Venkata Raman
- Ramsauer–Townsend effect (a.k.a. Ramsauer effect, Townsend effect) – Carl Ramsauer and John Sealy Townsend
- Ramsden circle/disc/eyepoint, eyepiece – Jesse Ramsden
- Ramsey theory – Frank Plumpton Ramsey
- Rankine cycle – William John Macquorn Rankine
- Rapoport's rule – Eduardo H. Rapoport
- Raychaudhuri's equation – Amal Kumar Raychaudhuri (অমল কুমার রায়চৌধুরী)
- Raygor Estimate Graph – Alton L. Raygor
- Rayleigh criterion, distribution, fading, number, quotient, scattering, waves – Lord Rayleigh
- Rayleigh–Bénard cell/convection – Lord Rayleigh and Henri Bénard
- Rayleigh–Jeans law – Lord Rayleigh and James Jeans
- Rayleigh–Taylor instability – Lord Rayleigh and G. I. Taylor
- Rees–Sciama effect – Martin Rees and Dennis Sciama
- Reidemeister moves – Kurt Reidemeister
- Résal effect – Louis-Jean Résal
- Rescorla–Wagner rule – Robert A. Rescorla and Allan R. Wagner
- Reynolds number, Reynolds analogy – Osborne Reynolds
- Ribot's law (of Retrograde Amnesia) – Théodule-Armand Ribot
- Ricardian equivalence (a.k.a. Barro–Ricardo equivalence, or Ricardo–de Viti–Barro equivalence) – Robert Barro, David Ricardo, and Antonio de Viti de Marco
- Richards controller – Charles L. Richards
- Richardson's constant, equation, law – Owen Willans Richardson
- Richardson number – Lewis Fry Richardson
- Richter magnitude scale – Charles Francis Richter
- Righi–Leduc effect (a.k.a. Leduc–Righi effect) – Augusto Righi and Sylvestre Anatole Leduc
- Ringelmann effect – Max Ringelmann
- Robertson–Walker metric (a.k.a. Friedmann–Robertson–Walker metric) – see Friedmann–Lemaître–Robertson–Walker metric, above
- Roche limit – Édouard Roche
- Roche sphere (a.k.a. Hill sphere) – Édouard Roche (and George William Hill)
- Rollin film – Bernard V. Rollin
- Rosenthal effect (a.k.a. Pygmalion effect, observer-expectancy effect) – Robert Rosenthal (and Pygmalion)
- Rossby waves – Carl-Gustaf Arvid Rossby
- Rossi–Forel scale – Michele Stefano Conte de Rossi and François-Alphonse Forel
- Rössler equation – Otto Rössler
- Rossmann fold – Michael Rossmann
- Royer oscillator – George H. Royer
- Ruelle operator, zeta function – David Ruelle
- Ruelle–Perron–Frobenius theorem – David Ruelle, Oskar Perron, and Ferdinand Georg Frobenius
- Ruhmkorff coil – Heinrich D. Ruhmkorff
- Runge–Lenz vector – see Laplace–Runge–Lenz vector
- Runge's phenomenon – Carle David Tolmé Runge
- Russell's paradox – Bertrand Russell
- Rutherford experiment (a.k.a. Geiger–Marsden experiment), scattering – Ernest Rutherford
- Rybczynski theorem – Tadeusz Rybczynski
- Rydberg constant, formula – Johannes Rydberg
- Rydberg–Klein–Rees method – Johannes Rydberg, Oskar Klein, and Albert Lloyd George Rees

== S ==
- Sabatier or Sabattier effect – Sabat[t]ier, first name unknown
- Sachs–Wolfe effect – Rainer K. Sachs and Arthur M. Wolfe
- Saffir–Simpson hurricane wind scale – Herbert S. Saffir and Robert ("Bob") Simpson
- Sagnac effect – Georges Sagnac
- Saha ionization equation (a.k.a. Saha–Langmuir equation) – Megh Nad Saha (মেঘনাদ সাহা) (and Irving Langmuir)
- Salem number – Raphaël Salem
- Sapir–Whorf hypothesis – Edward Sapir and Benjamin Whorf
- Sasakian manifold, metric – Shigeo Sasaki
- Say's law – Jean-Baptiste Say
- Scheerer's phenomenon (Blue field entoptic phenomenon) – Richard Scheerer
- Schering Bridge – Harald Schering
- Schild plot, regression analysis – Heinz Otto Schild
- Schmidt law, Schmidt–Kennicutt law – see Kennicutt–Schmidt law, above
- Schottky effect – Walter H. Schottky
- Schröter effect – Johann Hieronymus Schröter
- Schülen–Wilson effect – see Wilson effect, below
- Schuler period, tuning – Maximilian Schuler
- Schultz's rule – Adolph Hans Schultz
- Schumann–Runge bands – Victor Schumann and Carle David Tolmé Runge
- Schwabe solar cycle – Samuel Heinrich Schwabe
- Schwarzschild effect, metric, radius – Karl Schwarzschild
- Scott effect – Elizabeth L. Scott
- Secchi (stellar) class, depth, disk – Pietro Angelo Secchi
- Seebeck effect – Thomas Johann Seebeck
- Seiberg–Witten gauge theory – Nathan Seiberg and Edward Witten
- Seiberg–Witten invariant – Nathan Seiberg and Edward Witten
- Senftleben–Beenakker effect – Hermann Senftleben and Jan J. M. Beenakker
- Sertoli cells – Enrico Sertoli
- Serre duality – Jean-Pierre Serre
- Seyfert galaxy – Carl Keenan Seyfert
- Shapiro effect – Irwin Shapiro
- Shimizu–Morioka attractor, equations – Tatsujiro Shimizu and Nozomi Morioka
- Shubnikov–de Haas effect – Wander Johannes de Haas and Lev Vasiljevich Shubnikov
- Sieberg tsunami intensity scale – August Heinrich Sieberg
- Sieberg–Ambraseys tsunami intensity scale – August Heinrich Sieberg and Nicholas Ambraseys
- Simmons–Smith reaction – Howard Ensign Simmons, Jr.
- Simpson's paradox (a.k.a. Yule–Simpson effect) – Edward H. Simpson (and Udny Yule)
- Simroth's organs – Heinrich Rudolf Simroth
- Smale's horseshoe – Stephen Smale
- Smale–Rössler theorem – Stephen Smale and Otto Rössler
- Smith–Waterman algorithm – Temple F. Smith and Michael S. Waterman
- Snell's law – Willebrord van Roijen Snell
- Soloviev tsunami intensity scale – Sergey L. Soloviev
- Sommerfeld–Kossel displacement law – Arnold Sommerfeld and Walther Kossel
- Sørensen similarity index, similarity coefficient – Thorvald Sørensen
- Spörer's law, Spörer Minimum – Gustav Spörer
- St. Elmo's fire – Erasmus of Formiae
- St. Robert's law (a.k.a. Vieille's law) – Comte Paul Ballada de Saint-Robert, a.k.a. Conte Paolo Ballada di San Roberto (1815–1888)
- Staebler–Wronski effect – David L. Staebler and Christopher R. Wronski
- Stark effect (a.k.a. Stark–Lo Surdo effect) – Johannes Stark (and Antonino Lo Surdo)
- Stark ladder (a.k.a. Wannier–Stark ladder, q.v.) – Johannes Stark and Gregory Hugh Wannier
- Stark–Einstein law – Johannes Stark and Albert Einstein
- Stebbins–Whitford effect – Joel Stebbins and Albert Edward Whitford
- Stefan's constant, law (a.k.a. Stefan–Boltzmann constant, law) – Jožef Stefan (and Ludwig Boltzmann)
- Stensen's duct – Niels Stensen
- Stern–Levison parameter – S. Alan Stern and Harold F. Levison
- Stevens effect – Joseph C. and Stanley Smith Stevens
- Stevens's power law – Stanley Smith Stevens
- Stewart's organs – Charles Stewart
- Stewart–Tolman effect – Thomas Dale Stewart and Richard Chace Tolman
- Stigler's law of eponymy – Stephen Stigler
- Stirling number – James Stirling
- Stokes radius – George Gabriel Stokes
- Stokes shift – George Gabriel Stokes
- Stolper–Samuelson theorem – Paul Samuelson and Wolfgang Stolper
- Strömgren age, photometry, sphere – Bengt Georg Daniel Strömgren
- Strömgren–Crawford photometry – Bengt Georg Daniel Strömgren and David L. Crawford
- Stroop effect – John Ridley Stroop
- Strouhal number – Vincenc Strouhal
- Stueckelberg action – Ernst Carl Gerlach Stueckelberg
- Sturgeon's law – Theodore Sturgeon
- Sturmian trajectories – Charles François Sturm
- Suess effect – Hans Eduard Suess
- Suess solar cycle, DeVries solar cycle, Suess-DeVries solar cycle – Hans Eduard Suess and Hessel de Vries
- Sunyaev–Zel'dovich effect – Rashid Sunyaev and Yakov Zel'dovich
- Syracuse problem – see Collatz conjecture, above
- Szilard–Chalmers effect – Leó Szilárd and Thomas A. Chalmers

== T ==
- Tait–Bryan angles (a.k.a. Cardan angles, nautical angles) – Peter Guthrie Tait and George H. Bryan
- Talbot effect – William Henry Fox Talbot
- Tanimoto coefficient, distance, measure, score, similarity – Taffee T. Tanimoto
- Taylor cone – Geoffrey Ingram Taylor
- Taylor-Couette flow – Geoffrey Ingram Taylor and Maurice Marie Alfred Couette
- Teller–Ulam design – Edward Teller and Stanislaw Ulam
- Thévenin's theorem – Léon Charles Thévenin
- Thirring effect – see Lense–Thirring effect, above
- Thomas precession – Llewellyn Thomas
- Thomas–Fermi approximation, model – Llewellyn Hilleth Thomas and Enrico Fermi
- Thomson cross-section, effect – William Thomson, 1st Baron Kelvin
- Thomson structure (a.k.a. Widmanstätten pattern) – William (Guglielmo) Thomson (or Count Alois von Beckh Widmanstätten)
- Thorndike's laws (of effect, readiness, and exercise) – Edward L. Thorndike
- Thorson's rule – Gunnar Thorson
- Thouless energy – David J. Thouless
- Thwaites conjecture – see Collatz conjecture, above
- Tiedemann's bodies – Friedrich Tiedemann
- Tiffeneau–Demjanov rearrangement – Marc Tiffeneau and Nikolai Demyanov
- Tobin's q – James Tobin
- Tolman effects – Richard Chace Tolman
- Tolman–Oppenheimer–Volkoff limit – Richard Chace Tolman, J. Robert Oppenheimer, and George Michael Volkoff
- Tonks–Girardeau gas – Lewi Tonks and Marvin D. Girardeau
- Townsend effect (a.k.a. Ramsauer effect, Ramsauer–Townsend effect), ionization coefficient – John Sealy Townsend
- Troxler's effect/fading – Ignaz Paul Vital Troxler
- Tychonoff space – Andrey Nikolayevich Tychonoff
- Tyndall effect/scattering – John Tyndall

== U ==
- Ulam conjecture – see Collatz conjecture
- Ulam's packing conjecture – Stanislaw Ulam
- Unruh effect – William G. Unruh

== V ==
- Vackář oscillator – Jirí Vackář
- Van Allen radiation belt – James Van Allen
- Van de Graaff generator – Dr. Robert Jemison Van de Graaff
- Van der Pol equation, oscillator – Balthasar van der Pol
- Van der Waals force – Johannes Diderik van der Waals
- Van Hove singularity – Léon Van Hove
- Vavilovian mimicry – Nikolai Ivanovich Vavilov
- Veblen effect – Thorstein Veblen
- Veitch diagram – see Karnaugh map, above
- Venturi effect – Giovanni Battista Venturi
- Venn diagram – John Venn
- Vieille's law (a.k.a. St. Robert's law, often misspelled as Vielle's law) – Paul Marie Eugène Vieille
- Vierordt's law – Karl von Vierordt
- Vogel-Fulcher-Tammann equation – Hans Vogel, Gordon Scott Fulcher, and Gustav Tammann
- Vogt–Russell theorem – Heinrich Vogt and Henry Norris Russell
- Voigt effect, notation, profile – Woldemar Voigt
- Voigt material – see Kelvin–Voigt material, above
- Von Klitzing constant – Klaus von Klitzing
- Von Neumann ordinal, von Neumann architecture – John von Neumann
- Von Restorff effect – Hedwig von Restorff
- Von Zeipel theorem – Edvard Hugo von Zeipel

== W ==
- Wadati–Benioff zone (a.k.a. Benioff zone) – Kiyoo Wadati and Hugo Benioff
- Wahlund effect – Sten Gösta William Wahlund
- Wallace's line – Alfred Russel Wallace
- Walras's law – Léon Walras
- Wannier function, orbital – Gregory Wannier
- Wasserman 9-Panel Plot – Karlman Wasserman
- Wannier–Stark ladder (a.k.a. Stark ladder) – Gregory Wannier and Johannes Stark
- Warburg effect – Otto Warburg
- Waring's problem (a.k.a. Hilbert–Waring theorem) – Edward Waring (and David Hilbert)
- Weber–Fechner law (Weber's law, Fechner's law) – Ernst Heinrich Weber and Gustav Theodor Fechner
- Weberian apparatus – Ernst Heinrich Weber
- Weierstrass–Casorati theorem – Karl Theodor Wilhelm Weierstrass and Felice Casorati
- Weierstrass's elliptic functions, factorization theorem, function, M-test, preparation theorem – Karl Theodor Wilhelm Weierstrass
- Wien bridge – Max Wien
- Weissenberg effect – Karl Weissenberg
- Wess–Zumino–Witten model – Julius Wess, Bruno Zumino and Edward Witten
- Wess–Zumino model – Julius Wess, Bruno Zumino
- Westermarck effect – Edvard Westermarck
- Weston cell – Edward Weston
- Wheatstone bridge – Charles Wheatstone (improved and popularized it; the inventor was Samuel Hunter Christie)
- Whittaker function, integral, model – Edmund Taylor Whittaker
- Whittaker–Shannon interpolation formula – Edmund Taylor Whittaker, John Macnaghten Whittaker, Claude Shannon
- Widmanstätten pattern (a.k.a. Thomson structure) – Count Alois von Beckh Widmanstätten (or William (Guglielmo) Thomson)
- Widom line – Benjamin Widom
- Widrow–Hoff least mean squares filter – Bernard Widrow and Ted Hoff
- Wiedemann–Franz law – Gustav Wiedemann and Rudolf Franz
- Wiegand effect – John R. Wiegand
- Wien bridge (Wien's bridge), constant, effect, law – Wilhelm Wien
- Wiener filter, process – Norbert Wiener
- Wigmore chart – John Henry Wigmore
- Wigner energy, Wigner effect – Eugene Wigner
- Wigner–Seitz cell – Eugene Wigner and Frederick Seitz
- Wilson cycle – John Tuzo Wilson
- Wilson effect – Alexander Wilson
- Wilson–Bappu effect – Olin Chaddock Wilson and Manali Kallat Vainu Bappu
- Witten index – Edward Witten
- Wollaston prism – William Hyde Wollaston
- Woodward–Hoffmann rules – Robert Burns Woodward and Roald Hoffmann
- Wolf effect – Emil Wolf
- Wulf bands – Oliver R. Wulf
- Wulff–Dötz reaction – William Wulff and Karl Heinz Dötz

== Y ==
- Yarkovsky effect – Ivan Osipovich Yarkovsky
- YORP effect – Ivan Osipovich Yarkovsky, John A. O'Keefe, Vladimir Vyacheslavovich Radzievskii, and Stephen J. Paddack
- Young diagram (a.k.a. Ferrers diagram), Young tableau – Alfred Young
- Young's modulus – Thomas Young
- Yule–Simpson effect (a.k.a. Simpson's paradox) – Edward H. Simpson and Udny Yule

== Z ==
- Zeeman effect – Pieter Zeeman
- Zeigarnik effect – Bluma Zeigarnik
- Zener effect – Clarence Melvin Zener
- Zeno effect – Zeno of Elea
- Zipf's law – George K. Zipf
- Zipf–Mandelbrot law (a.k.a. Pareto–Zipf law) – George K. Zipf and Benoît Mandelbrot (or Vilfredo Pareto)

== See also ==
- Eponyms
- Fields of science
- List of eponymous laws
- List of eponymous medical signs
- List of scientists
- Lists of etymologies
- List of eponymous diseases
- List of fluid flows named after people
- List of hydrodynamic instabilities named after people
- List of waves named after people
- Scientific constants named after people
- Scientific laws named after people
