= Stebbins–Whitford effect =

The Stebbins–Whitford effect refers to the excess reddening of the spectra of elliptical galaxies as shown by measurements published by Joel Stebbins and Albert Whitford In 1948. The spectra were shifted much more to the red than the Hubble redshift could account for. Furthermore, this excess reddening increased with the distance of the galaxies.

The effect was only found for elliptical and not for spiral galaxies. One possible explanation was that younger galaxies contain more red giants than older galaxies. This kind of evolution could not exist according to the steady-state theory. Later analysis of the same data showed that the data was inadequate to establish the claimed effect. After further measurements and analysis Whitford withdrew the claim in 1956.

== See also ==
Scientific phenomena named after people
