= Ernst Brüche =

German physicist

Ernst Carl Reinhold Brüche (28 March 1900 in Hamburg – 8 February 1985 in Mosbach) was a German physicist. From 1944 to 1972, he was the editor of the Physikalische Blätter, a publication of the Deutsche Physikalische Gesellschaft.

== Education ==
Brüche studied physics at the Danzig Technische Hochschule from 1919 to 1924. From 1920, he was a teaching assistant in the physics department. In 1926 he completed his doctorate under Carl Ramsauer at the Danzig Technische Hochschule. He completed his Habilitation in 1927.

== Career ==
Until 1933, Brüche was an unpaid lecturer on experimental and technical physics at the Danzig Technische Hochschule, where he worked on the measurement of electron scattering cross-sections of molecular gases.

From 1928 to 1945, he was head of the physics laboratories at the Allgemeine Elektrizitäts-Gesellschaft (AEG) in Reinickendorf, a borough of Berlin. At the AEG, he worked mostly on geometrical electron optics and developed an electron microscope. From 1946 to 1951, he was the head scientist of the Süddeutsches Laboratorium, in Mosbach. From 1948, he was the managing director of Physik-GmbH in Mosbach. After 1951, he was at the Physikalisches Laboratorium in Mosbach.

From 1944 to 1972, Brüche was the founding editor of the Physikalische Blätter.

== Awards ==
- 1941 – Leibniz Medal
- 1972 – First recipient of the Max Born-Medaille für Verantwortung in der Wissenschaft

== Literature ==
- Ernst Brüche Freie Elektronen als Sonden des Baues von Molekeln, Ergebnisse der exakten Naturwissenschaften 8 185-228 (1929)
- Ernst Brüche Die Grundlagen der angewandten geometrischen Elektronenoptik, Electrical Engineering (Archiv für Elektrotechnik) Volume 29, Number 2, 79-107 (1935). The author is cited as being at the Forschungs-institut der AEG, Berlin. The article was received on 12 August 1934.
- Ernst Brüche Zum Entstehen des Elektronenmikroskops, Physikalische Zeitschrift. 44 176-180 (1943)
- Ernst Brüche Deutsche Physik und die Deutschen Physiker, Neue Physikalische Blätter 2 232-236 (1946)
- Ernst Brüche 25 Jahre Elektronenmikroskop, Physikalische Blätter 13 493-500 (1957)

== Books ==
- Ernst Brüche Physiker-Anekdoten von Ernst Brüche (Physik-Verl., 1952)
- Carl Ramsauer, Rudolf Kollath, und Ernst Brüche Wirkungsquerschnitt der Edelgase gegenüber langsamen Elektronen (Geest & Portig, 1954)
- Theodor Pöschl, Carl Ramsauer, and Ernst Brüche Die Physik in Einzelberichten. H. 1. Mechanik (Barth, 1956)
- Heinz Thiede, Carl Ramsauer, and Ernst Brüche Die Physik in Einzelberichten. H. 2. Praktische Akustik (Barth, 1957)
- Helmut Moser, Helmut Moser, Carl Ramsauer, und Ernst Brüche Die Physik in Einzelberichten. H. 3. Wärmelehre?1. Mit Beitr von Helmut Moser. (Barth, 1957)
- Ernst Brüche Aus dem Leben eines Physikers (Mosbach, Baden, 1971)

== Bibliography ==
- Hentschel, Klaus, editor and Ann M. Hentschel, editorial assistant and Translator Physics and National Socialism: An Anthology of Primary Sources (Birkhäuser, 1996) ISBN 0-8176-5312-0
- Hentschel, Klaus with Ann M. Hentschel as translator The Mental Aftermath: The Mentality of German Physicists 1945 – 1949 (Oxford, 2007) ISBN 978-0-19-920566-0 (To a significant extent, Hentschel draws from Brüche’s diary, which is among Ernst Brüche’s papers at the Landesmuseum für Technik in Mannheim.)
