= Physik Journal =

- Language: English
- Former name: Physikalische Blätter

Standard abbreviations
- ISO 4: Phys. J.

Physik Journal is the official journal of the Deutsche Physikalische Gesellschaft. Before 2002 it was named Physikalische Blätter.

== History ==
The Physikalische Blätter was founded in 1943 by Ernst Brüche, who was also the editor from 1944 to 1972. At the start, it was issued by the Informationsstelle Deutscher Physiker. Starting in 1946, it became an official publication of the Deutsche Physikalische Gesellschaft (DPG) and was then published under the name Neue Physikalische Blätter. In 1948, the publication reverted to the name Physikalische Blätter. The last issue of Physikalische Blätter was published in December 2001, at which time it was replaced by Physik Journal. Members of the DPG and physik.de have on-line access through the Internet portal pro-physik.de to issues of Physikalische Blätter, and Physik Journal back to January 1999.

From a circular enclosed with the March 1946 issue of the Physikalische Blätter, the editor, Ernst Brüche, envisioned the publication, as "an undemanding journal to reestablish contacts within physics and to discuss issues of the day." In the wake of World War II, the journal became an important medium for discussion of science policy.

== Publishers ==
Publishers of Physikalische Blätter have included:

- Verlag Vieweg, Braunschweig (1943–1945)
- Verlag Mittelbach, Stuttgart (1946)
- Verlag Volk und Zeit, Karlsruhe (1947–1948)
- Physik Verlag, Mosbach/Baden (1949–1970)
- Physik Verlag, Weinheim (1971–1980)
- Physik-Verlag, Weinheim (1982–1985)
- VCH-Verlagsgesellschaft, Weinheim (1991–1996)
- Wiley-VCH Verlag, Weinheim (1997–2001)

== Bibliography ==
- Hentschel, Klaus, editor and Ann M. Hentschel, editorial assistant and translator Physics and National Socialism: An Anthology of Primary Sources (Birkhäuser, 1996) ISBN 0-8176-5312-0
- Hentschel, Klaus The Mental Aftermath: The Mentality of German Physicists 1945 – 1949 (Oxford, 2007) ISBN 978-0-19-920566-0 (In doing research for this book, Hentschel took extensive material from two sources: (1) Physikalische Blätter and (2) the diary of Ernst Brüche held with Brüche's papers in the Landesmuseum für Technik und Arbeit in Mannheim, Germany.)
