= John Reynolds (astronomer) =

British astronomer

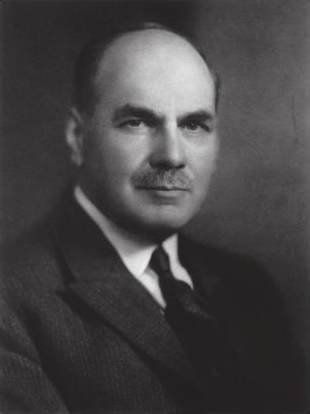

John Henry Reynolds (1874–1949) was a British astronomer who served as the president of the Royal Astronomical Society between 1935 and 1937 and is known for his work on the classification of stellar bodies. An amateur, he was the son of Alfred John Reynolds, the Lord Mayor of Birmingham, who owned a company which cut nails. In 1899, at age 25, he was elected a Fellow of the Royal Astronomical Society and in 1907, he financed the construction of a 30-inch reflecting telescope in Helwan, Egypt, the first large telescope to study objects in the such southerly skies. He also hand-constructed a 28-inch telescope in Harborne. Images from the Reynolds telescope was later used by Gérard de Vaucouleurs in his system of classifying galaxies; Reynolds also published his own classification for spiral galaxies in 1920. Edwin Hubble frequently corresponded with Reynolds, and some of his findings into the classification of stellar bodies seems at least inspired by his work. The Hubble–Reynolds law, a formula for measuring the surface brightness of elliptical galaxies, is named after them.
