= Schild equation =

Equation used in pharmacology

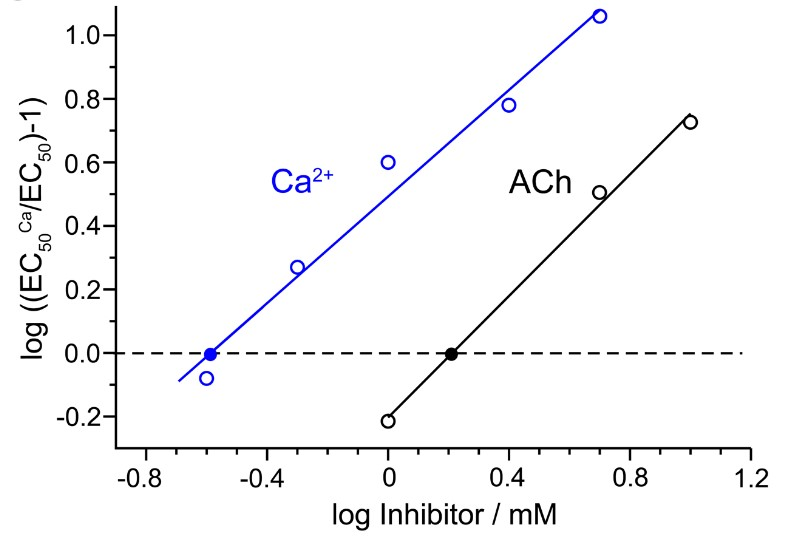
A Schild plot, demonstrating its use for the calculation of the binding affinity of competitive antagonists

In pharmacology, Schild regression analysis, based upon the Schild equation, both named for Heinz Otto Schild, are tools for studying the effects of agonists and antagonists on the response caused by the receptor, or on ligand-receptor binding.

== Concept ==
Dose-response curves can be constructed to describe response or ligand-receptor complex formation as a function of the ligand concentration. Antagonists make it harder to form these complexes by inhibiting interactions of the ligand with its receptor. This is seen as a change in the dose response curve: typically a rightward shift or a lowered maximum. A reversible competitive antagonist should cause a rightward shift in the dose response curve, such that the new curve is parallel to the old one and the maximum is unchanged. This is because reversible competitive antagonists are surmountable antagonists. The magnitude of the rightward shift can be quantified with the dose ratio, r. The dose ratio r is the ratio of the dose of agonist required for half maximal response with the antagonist $\ce{B}$ present divided by the agonist required for half maximal response without antagonist ("control"). In other words, the ratio of the EC50s of the inhibited and un-inhibited curves. Thus, r represents both the strength of an antagonist and the concentration of the antagonist that was applied. An equation derived from the Gaddum equation can be used to relate r to $[\ce{B}]$, as follows:

$$r=1+\frac{[\ce{B}]}{K_B}$$

where

- r is the dose ratio
- $[\ce{B}]$ is the concentration of the antagonist
- $K_B$ is the equilibrium constant of the binding of the antagonist to the receptor

A Schild plot is a double logarithmic plot, typically $\log_{10}(r-1)$ as the ordinate and $\log_{10}[\ce{B}]$ as the abscissa. This is done by taking the base-10 logarithm of both sides of the previous equation after subtracting 1:

$$\log_{10}(r-1)=\log_{10}[\ce{B}]-\log_{10}(K_B)$$

This equation is linear with respect to $\log_{10}[\ce{B}]$, allowing for easy construction of graphs without computations. This was particular valuable before the use of computers in pharmacology became widespread. The x-intercept (where log_{10}(r-1)=0) of the graph represents the negative logarithm of $K_B$ and can be used to quantify the affinity of the antagonist.

These experiments must be carried out on a very wide range (therefore the logarithmic scale) as the mechanisms differ over a large scale, such as at high concentration of drug.

The fitting of the Schild plot to observed data points can be done with regression analysis.

== Schild regression for ligand binding ==
Although most experiments use cellular response as a measure of the effect, the effect is, in essence, a result of the binding kinetics; so, in order to illustrate the mechanism, ligand binding is used. A ligand A will bind to a receptor R according to an equilibrium constant :

$$K_d = \frac{ k_{-1} }{k_1}$$

Although the equilibrium constant is more meaningful, texts often mention its inverse, the affinity constant (K_{aff} = k_{1}/k_{−1}): A better binding means an increase of binding affinity.

The equation for simple ligand binding to a single homogeneous receptor is

$[AR]=\frac{[R]_t \, [A]}{[A]+K_d}$

This is the Hill-Langmuir equation, which is practically the Hill equation described for the agonist binding. In chemistry, this relationship is called the Langmuir equation, which describes the adsorption of molecules onto sites of a surface (see adsorption).

$[R]_t$ is the total number of binding sites, and when the equation is plotted it is the horizontal asymptote to which the plot tends; more binding sites will be occupied as the ligand concentration increases, but there will never be 100% occupancy. The binding affinity is the concentration needed to occupy 50% of the sites; the lower this value is the easier it is for the ligand to occupy the binding site.

The binding of the ligand to the receptor at equilibrium follows the same kinetics as an enzyme at steady-state (Michaelis–Menten equation), without the conversion of the bound substrate to product.

Agonists and antagonists can have various effects on ligand binding. They can change the maximum number of binding sites, the affinity of the ligand to the receptor, both effects together or even more bizarre effects when the system being studied is more intact, such as in tissue samples. (Tissue absorption, desensitization, and other non equilibrium steady-state can be a problem.)

A surmountable drug changes the binding affinity:

- competitive ligand: $K_d'= K_d \frac{1+[B]}{K_b}$
- cooperative allosteric ligand: $K_d'= K_d \frac{K_B + [B]}{K_B + \frac{[B]}{\alpha} }$

A nonsurmountable drug changes the maximum binding:

- noncompetitive binding: $[R]'_t = \frac{[R]_t}{1 + \frac{[B]}{K_b} }$
- irreversible binding

The Schild regression also can reveal if there are more than one type of receptor and it can show if the experiment was done wrong as the system has not reached equilibrium.

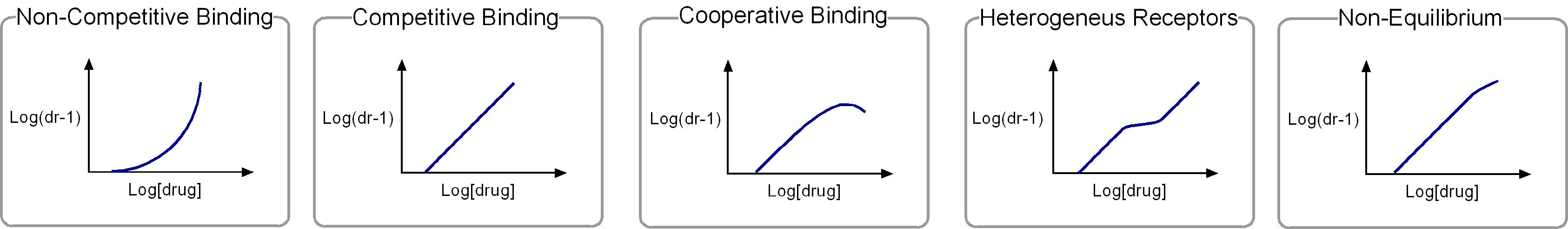

== Radioligand binding assays ==
The first radio-receptor assay (RRA) was done in 1970 by Lefkowitz et al., using a radiolabeled hormone to determine the binding affinity for its receptor.

A radio-receptor assay requires the separation of the bound from the free ligand. This is done by filtration, centrifugation or dialysis.

A method that does not require separation is the scintillation proximity assay that relies on the fact that β-rays from ^{3}H travel extremely short distances. The receptors are bound to beads coated with a polyhydroxy scintillator. Only the bound ligands to be detected.

Today, the fluorescence method is preferred to radioactive materials due to a much lower cost, lower hazard, and the possibility of multiplexing the reactions in a high-throughput manner. One problem is that fluorescent-labeled ligands have to bear a bulky fluorophore that may cause it to hinder the ligand binding. Therefore, the fluorophore used, the length of the linker, and its position must be carefully selected.

An example is by using FRET, where the ligand's fluorophore transfers its energy to the fluorophore of an antibody raised against the receptor.

Other detection methods such as surface plasmon resonance do not even require fluorophores.

== See also ==
- Dose-response relationship
