= Hans Mögel =

German engineer

Hans Ernst Mögel
- Born: May 31, 1900; Leipzig
- Died: April 10, 1944 (aged 43); Paris
- Education: TU Dresden
- Known for: Mögel–Dellinger effect
- Scientific career
- Doctoral advisor: Heinrich Barkhausen

Hans Ernst Mögel (May 31, 1900 – April 10, 1944) was a German electrical engineer. He is known for his observation of sudden ionospheric disturbances, particularly the Mögel–Dellinger effect.

== Life ==
Mögel was born in Leipzig. In 1922, he earned a degree in electrical engineering at the Dresden University of Technology. He finished his thesis on the Simultaneous Excitation of Two Oscillations with the Help of a Three-Element Vacuum Tube supervised by Heinrich Barkhausen in 1926, defending it in 1927.

From 1926 to 1932 Mögel worked for Transradio, a subsidy of Telefunken. During this time he published a significant paper titled About Relationships Between Short-Wave Receiving Disturbances and Disturbance of the Magnetic Field of the Earth, in which he described a new phenomenon creating short time disturbances in the sunlit hemisphere fundamentally different from geomagnetically related disturbances. Later in 1935 John Howard Dellinger identified a connection of this phenomenon to solar flares.

During World War II Mögel was a member of the corps of engineers of the Luftwaffe and was stationed in Paris as the head of the air force communication service. His activities in this role suggest involvement in the Battle of the Beams. Mögel died in Paris in 1944 from a heart attack.
