= Robert Kennicutt =

American astronomer

Robert C. Kennicutt, Jr
- Born: September 4, 1951 (age 74); Baltimore, MD
- Education: Rensselaer Polytechnic Institute; University of Washington
- Awards: Dannie Heineman Prize for Astrophysics (2007); Gruber Prize in Cosmology (2009)
- Scientific career
- Fields: Astronomy
- Workplaces: Texas A&M University
- Thesis: H II regions as extragalactic distance indicators (1978)

Robert Charles Kennicutt, Jr. FRS is an American astronomer. He is currently a professor at Texas A&M University. He is a former Plumian Professor of Astronomy at the Institute of Astronomy in the University of Cambridge. He was formerly Editor-in-Chief of the Astrophysical Journal (1999–2006) and became a co-editor of the Annual Review of Astronomy and Astrophysics as of 2021. His research interests include the structure and evolution of galaxies and star formation in galaxies.

== Career ==
He received his bachelor's degree in physics from Rensselaer Polytechnic Institute in 1973. He was a graduate student in astronomy at the University of Washington, where he received his master's degree in 1976 and his Ph.D. in 1978.

Kennicutt formulated a version of the Kennicutt–Schmidt law, which is an empirical relation between the gas density and star formation rate (SFR) in a given region.

== Research ==
=== Spitzer Infrared Nearby Galaxies Survey ===
Kennicutt is the principal investigator for the Spitzer Infrared Nearby Galaxies Survey (SINGS), a legacy project that performed a multiwavelength survey of 75 nearby galaxies with the Spitzer Space Telescope.

== Honors and awards ==
He was awarded the Dannie Heineman Prize for Astrophysics in 2007 by the American Astronomical Society. He shared the 2009 Gruber Prize in Cosmology with Wendy Freedman of the Carnegie Institution of Washington and Jeremy Mould of the University of Melbourne School of Physics, for their leadership in the definitive measurement of the value of the constant of proportionality in Hubble's law. He was made a fellow of the American Academy of Arts and Sciences in 2001 and appointed a Fellow of the Royal Society in 2011. He was awarded the Gold Medal of the Royal Astronomical Society for Astronomy in 2019.

He was elected a Legacy Fellow of the American Astronomical Society in 2020.
