= Heinz Otto Schild =

Italian pharmacologist (1906–1984)

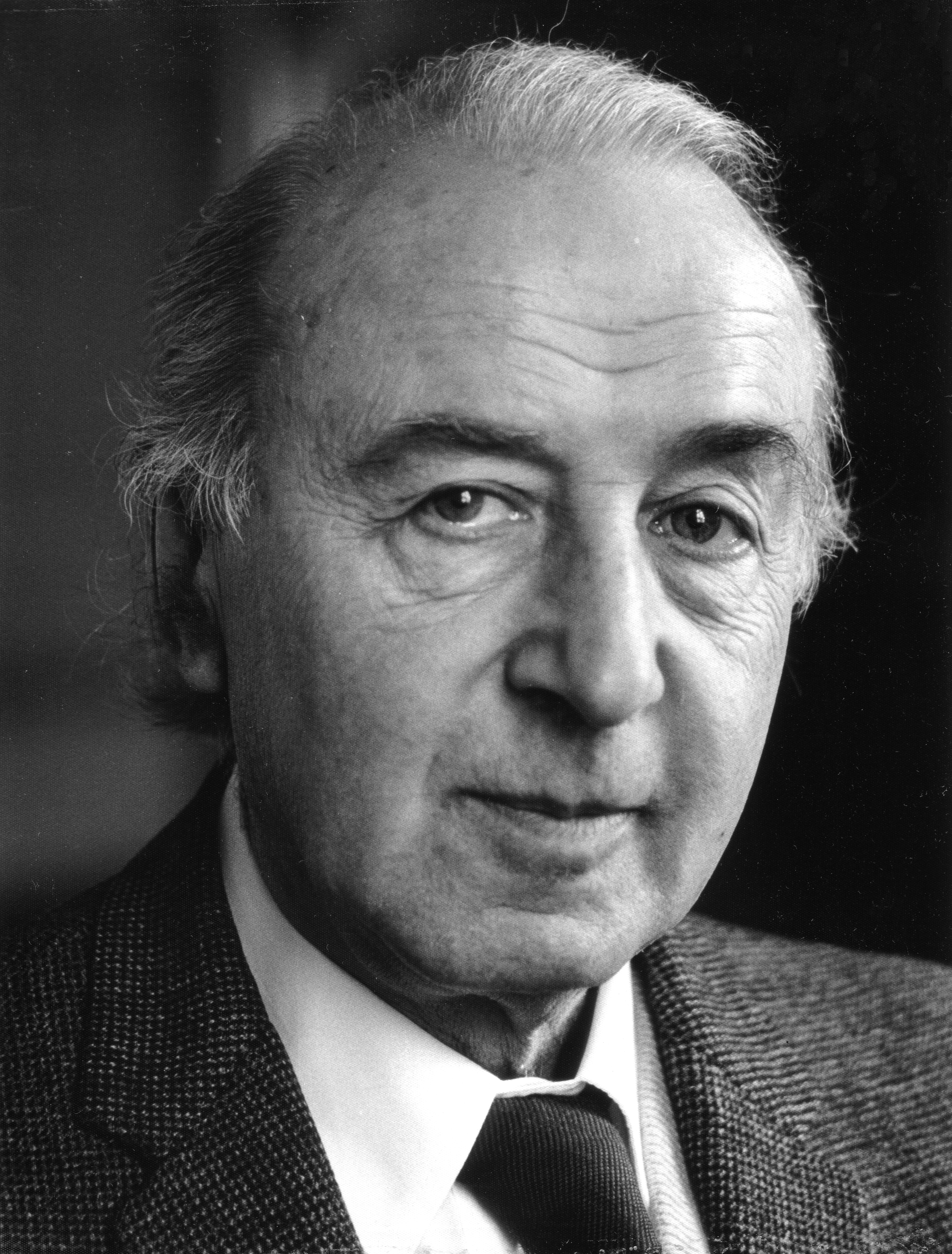
Heinz Otto Schild (1908-1984)

Heinz Otto Schild FRS (18 May 1906–15 June 1984), was a pharmacologist now known for the development of the Schild plot.

== Life ==
H.O. Schild was born into a Jewish family in what was Fiume, Austria-Hungary, and is now Rijeka, Croatia. During the rise of fascism he was schooled in Munich (from 1915) then Budapest (from 1917). He studied medicine in Munich and Berlin in the 1920s, with later studies focused on Pharmacology. In 1932s he moved to England to work in Henry Dale's laboratory, working also with John Gaddum.

In 1937 he married Mireille Madeline Haquin.

As an enemy alien (in his case, an Italian citizen) in the UK before the Second World War, he was interned during 1939-1940 on the Isle of Man. However, his release from the camp was eventually secured by appeals from the scientific community; he stayed in Britain and gained British citizenship in 1948.

== Work ==
He is particularly known for:

- The role of histamine in anaphylaxis
- Rigorous bioassay methods, including Schild regression
- The proposal that there are two main types of histamine receptors

== Honors and awards ==
- 1966: Fellow of the Royal Society
- 1977: Schmiedeberg Plakette of the German Pharmacological Society
- 1981: Wellcome Gold Medal of the British Pharmacological Society
- 2013: Headquarters of the BPS named the 'Schild Plot' in his honor
- 2014: Inducted in the British Pharmacological Society Hall of Fame
