= Sudden ionospheric disturbance =

Enhanced ionization of the ionosphere

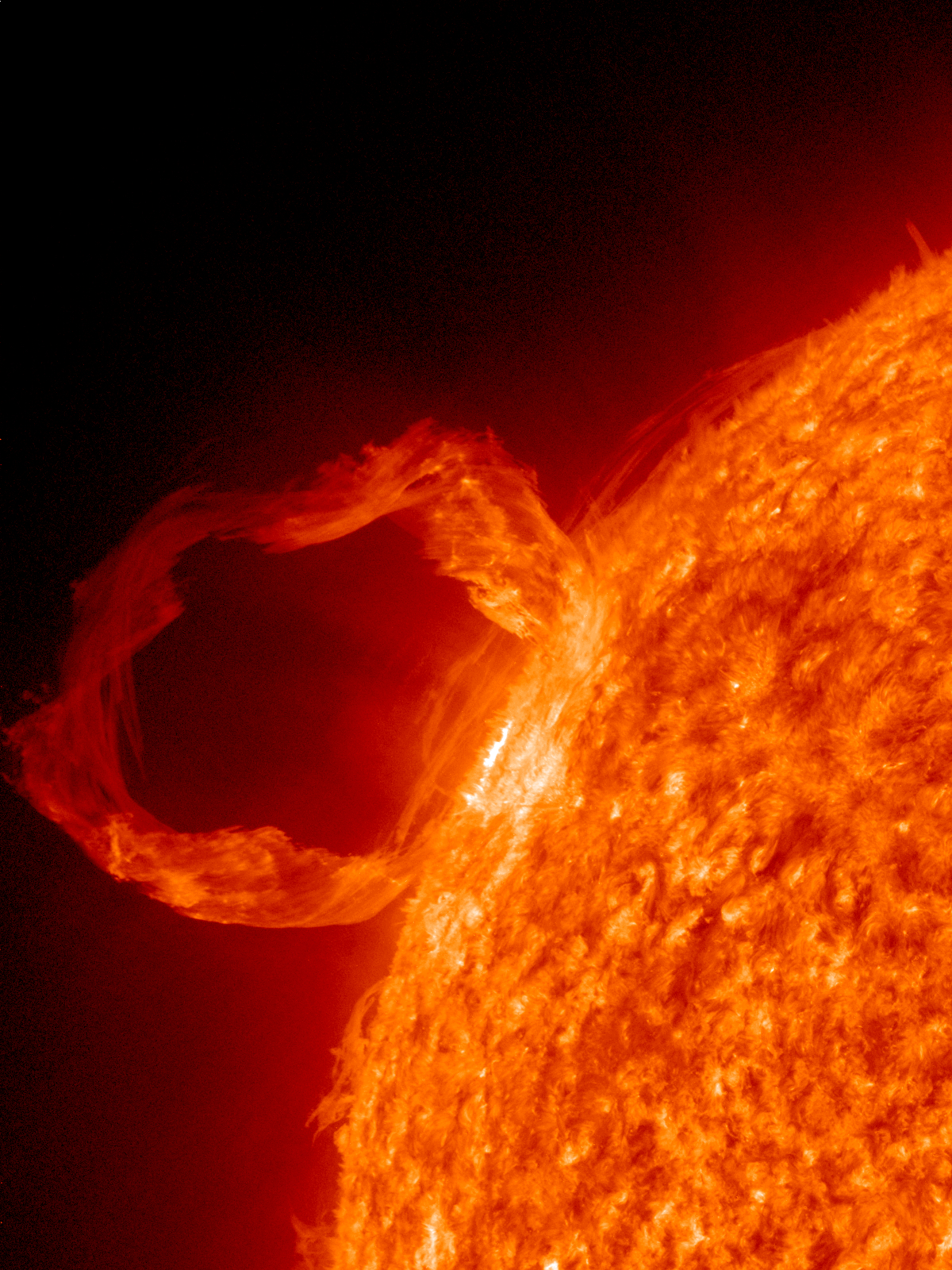
Solar eruption, extreme ultraviolet emission line is from singly ionized Helium, or He II, and corresponds to a temperature of approx. 50,000 degrees Celsius.

A sudden ionospheric disturbance (SID) is any one of several ionospheric perturbations, resulting from abnormally high ionization/plasma density in the D region of the ionosphere and caused by a solar flare and/or solar particle event (SPE). The SID results in a sudden increase in radio-wave absorption that is most severe in the upper medium frequency (MF) and lower high frequency (HF) ranges, and as a result often interrupts or interferes with telecommunications systems.

== Discovery ==
The Dellinger effect, or sometimes Mögel–Dellinger effect, is another name for a sudden ionospheric disturbance. The effect was discovered by John Howard Dellinger around 1935 and also described by the German physicist Hans Mögel (1900-1944) in 1930. The fadeouts are characterized by sudden onset and a recovery that takes minutes or hours.

== Cause ==
When a solar flare occurs on the Sun a blast of intense ultraviolet (UV) and x-ray (sometimes even gamma ray) radiation hits the dayside of the Earth after a propagation time of about 8 minutes. This high energy radiation is absorbed by atmospheric particles, raising them to excited states and knocking electrons free in the process of photoionization. The low altitude ionospheric layers (D region and E region) immediately increase in density over the entire dayside. The ionospheric disturbance enhances VLF radio propagation. Scientists on the ground can use this enhancement to detect solar flares; by monitoring the signal strength of a distant VLF transmitter, sudden ionospheric disturbances (SIDs) are recorded and indicate when solar flares have taken place. The small geomagnetic effect in the lower ionosphere appears as a small hook on magnetic records and is therefore called "geomagnetic crochet effect" or "sudden field effect".

== Effects on radio waves ==
Short wave radio waves (in the HF range) are absorbed by the increased particles in the low altitude D-region of the ionosphere, causing a complete blackout of radio communications. Solar flares can also contribute to short‑term disturbances in the upper atmosphere that influence its temperature structure and circulation patterns, linking sudden ionization events in the D‑region to broader space‑weather effects on atmospheric dynamics. This is called a short wave fadeout (SWF). These fadeouts last for a few minutes to a few hours and are most severe in the equatorial regions where the Sun is most directly overhead. Although High Frequency signals suffer a fadeout because of the enhanced D-layer, the Sudden Ionospheric Disturbance enhances long wave (VLF) radio propagation. SIDs are observed and recorded by monitoring the signal strength of a distant VLF transmitter. A whole array of sub-classes of SIDs exist, detectable by different techniques at various wavelengths: the short-wave fadeout (SWF), the SPA (Sudden Phase Anomaly), SFD (Sudden Frequency Deviation), SCNA (Sudden Cosmic Noise Absorption), SEA (Sudden Enhancement of Atmospherics), etc.

== See also ==
- Ionospheric storm
- Space weather
