= Stevens effect =

Stevens effect may refer to:

- In color theory, the Stevens effect discovered by Joseph C. and Stanley Smith Stevens ((1963) Brightness functions: Effects of Adaptation, Journal of the Optical Society of America, 53, pp. 375–385)
- United States Senate election in Alaska, 2008
