= Kennicutt–Schmidt law =

Astronomical trend of star formation

In astronomy, the Kennicutt–Schmidt law is an empirical relation between the surface gas density and star formation rate (SFR) in a given region. The relation was first examined by Maarten Schmidt in a 1959 paper where he proposed a relationship between the surface density of gas and the rate at which stars are formed within that cloud.

== Definition ==
SFR surface density scales as some positive power $n$ of the local gas surface density. I.e.

$$\Sigma_{SFR} \propto (\Sigma_{gas})^n$$.

In general, the SFR surface density $(\Sigma_{SFR})$ is in units of solar masses per year per square parsec $(M_\odot ~\textrm{ yr}^{-1} \textrm{ pc}^{-2})$ and the gas surface density in grams per square parsec $(\textrm{g}~\textrm{pc}^{-2})$.

The value of n in the Kennicutt-Schmidt law can be a local law, defining regions less than 1 kiloparsec, or a global law, averaging SFR surface density and gas surface density over an entire galaxy. Local values of $n$ have more variation than global ones.

== Value of $n$ ==
Using an analysis of gaseous helium and young stars in the solar neighborhood, the local density of white dwarfs and their luminosity function, and the local helium density, Schmidt suggested a value of $n \approx 2$ (and very likely between 1 and 3). All of the data used were gathered from the Milky Way, and specifically the solar neighborhood.

In 1989, Robert Kennicutt found that the H$\alpha$ intensities in a sample of 15 galaxies could be fit with the earlier Schmidt relations with a power law index of $n = 1.3 \pm 0.3$. More recently, he examined the connection between surface gas density and SFR for a larger set of galaxies to estimate a value of $n = 1.4 \pm 0.15$.

In the early universe, star formation rates were much higher, but evidence has shown that the K-S law still holds for high redshift galaxies. In 2012 one group used gravitational lenses to look at galaxies with a redshift of $z = 3.9$ and saw values of $n=1.4\pm0.2$.

A paper found that the value of $n$ in the K-S law has a strong relationship with the gravitational instability of a galaxy. Measuring this relationship was done using the Toomre $(Q_{gs})$ parameter for stars and gas with the first order approximation:

$$Q_{gs} \propto \frac{1}{(\Sigma_{gs})}$$

to find that the values of $(Q_{gs})$ for nearby galaxies quantifiably correlate with their values of n in the K-S law. However, the Toomre parameter and approximations used in this paper assume that the galaxy is disk-like, following Toomre's approximations on the gravitational stability of a disk of stars.

A limitation of the K-S law is that if a $\Sigma_{gas}$is below a threshold $\Sigma_{crit}$ then star formation sharply drops off.

Additional research has found that the ratio between gas and crit in spiral galaxies is double what it is in irregular galaxies. It is highest at intermediate radii and lowest at small radii, decreasing at large radii. Star formation in irregular galaxies typically is greatest at small and intermediate radii and lessens with increasing radii, which suggests that the gas surface area to critical surface area ratio does not track star formation in irregular galaxies as well as spiral galaxies.
