= Lode coordinates =

Surfaces on which the invariants $\xi$, $\rho$, $\theta$ are constant. Plotted in principal stress space. The red plane represents a meridional plane and the yellow plane an octahedral plane.

Lode coordinates $(z,r,\theta)$ or Haigh–Westergaard coordinates $(\xi,\rho,\theta)$. are a set of tensor invariants that span the space of real, symmetric, second-order, 3-dimensional tensors and are isomorphic with respect to principal stress space. This right-handed orthogonal coordinate system is named in honor of the German scientist Dr. Walter Lode because of his seminal paper written in 1926 describing the effect of the middle principal stress on metal plasticity. Other examples of sets of tensor invariants are the set of principal stresses $(\sigma_1, \sigma_2, \sigma_3)$ or the set of kinematic invariants $(I_1, J_2, J_3)$. The Lode coordinate system can be described as a cylindrical coordinate system within principal stress space with a coincident origin and the z-axis parallel to the vector $(\sigma_1,\sigma_2,\sigma_3)=(1,1,1)$.

== Mechanics invariants ==
The Lode coordinates are most easily computed using the mechanics invariants. These invariants are a mixture of the invariants of the Cauchy stress tensor, $\boldsymbol{\sigma}$, and the stress deviator, $\boldsymbol{s}$, and are given by

$$I_1 = \mathrm{tr}(\boldsymbol{\sigma})$$

$$J_2 = \frac{1}{2}\left[\text{tr}(\boldsymbol{\sigma}^2) - \frac{1}{3}\text{tr}(\boldsymbol{\sigma})^2\right] = \frac{1}{2}\mathrm{tr}\left(\boldsymbol{s}\cdot\boldsymbol{s}\right) = \frac{1}{2}\lVert \boldsymbol{s} \rVert^2$$

$$J_3 = \mathrm{det}(\boldsymbol{s}) = \frac{1}{3}\mathrm{tr}\left(\boldsymbol{s}\cdot\boldsymbol{s}\cdot\boldsymbol{s}\right)$$

which can be written equivalently in Einstein notation

$$I_1 = \sigma_{kk}$$

$$J_2 = \frac{1}{2}\left[\text{tr}(\boldsymbol{\sigma}^2) - \frac{1}{3}\text{tr}(\boldsymbol{\sigma})^2\right] = \frac{1}{2}s_{ij}s_{ji} = \frac{1}{2}s_{ij}s_{ij}$$

$$J_3 = \frac{1}{6}\epsilon_{ijk}\epsilon_{pqr}\sigma_{ip}\sigma_{jq}\sigma_{kr} = \frac{1}{3}s_{ij}s_{jk}s_{ki}$$

where $\epsilon$ is the Levi-Civita symbol (or permutation symbol) and the last two forms for $J_2$ are equivalent because $\boldsymbol{s}$ is symmetric ($s_{ij}=s_{ji}$).

The gradients of these invariants can be calculated by

$$\frac{\partial I_1}{\partial \boldsymbol{\sigma}} = \boldsymbol{I}$$

$$\frac{\partial J_2}{\partial \boldsymbol{\sigma}} = \boldsymbol{s} = \boldsymbol{\sigma} - \frac{\mathrm{tr}\left(\boldsymbol{\sigma}\right)}{3}\boldsymbol{I}$$

$$\frac{\partial J_3}{\partial \boldsymbol{\sigma}} = \boldsymbol{T} = \boldsymbol{s}\cdot\boldsymbol{s} - \frac{2J_2}{3}\boldsymbol{I}$$

where $\boldsymbol{I}$ is the second-order identity tensor and $\boldsymbol{T}$ is called the Hill tensor.

== Axial coordinate $(z)$ ==
The $z$-coordinate is found by calculating the magnitude of the orthogonal projection of the stress state onto the hydrostatic axis.

$$z =  \boldsymbol{E_z} \colon \boldsymbol{\sigma} = \frac{\mathrm{tr}(\boldsymbol{\sigma})}{\sqrt{3}} = \frac{I_1}{\sqrt{3}}$$

where

$$\boldsymbol{E_z} = \frac{\boldsymbol{I}}{\lVert \boldsymbol{I}\rVert} = \frac{\boldsymbol{I}}{\sqrt{3}}$$

is the unit normal in the direction of the hydrostatic axis.

== Radial coordinate $(r)$ ==
The $r$-coordinate is found by calculating the magnitude of the stress deviator (the orthogonal projection of the stress state into the deviatoric plane).

$$r = \boldsymbol{E_r}\colon \boldsymbol{\sigma} = \lVert \boldsymbol{s} \rVert = \sqrt{2 J_2}$$

where

$$\boldsymbol{E_r} = \frac{\boldsymbol{s}}{\lVert \boldsymbol{s} \rVert}$$

Derivation
The relation that $r=\sqrt{2J_2}$ can be found by expanding the relation

$$r = \frac{\boldsymbol{s}}{\lVert \boldsymbol{s} \rVert}\colon\boldsymbol{\sigma}$$

and writing $\sigma$ in terms of the isotropic and deviatoric parts while expanding the magnitude of $\boldsymbol{s}$

$$r = \frac{\boldsymbol{s}}{\sqrt{\boldsymbol{s}\colon\boldsymbol{s}}} \colon \left( \boldsymbol{s} + z \boldsymbol{E_z} \right) = \frac{1}{\sqrt{\boldsymbol{s}\colon\boldsymbol{s}}} \left( \boldsymbol{s}\colon\boldsymbol{s} + z \boldsymbol{s}\colon\boldsymbol{E_z}\right)$$.

Because $\boldsymbol{E_z}$ is isotropic and $\boldsymbol{s}$ is deviatoric, their product is zero. Which leaves us with

$$r = \frac{\boldsymbol{s}\colon\boldsymbol{s}}{\sqrt{\boldsymbol{s}\colon\boldsymbol{s}}} = \sqrt{\boldsymbol{s}\colon\boldsymbol{s}}$$

Applying the identity $\boldsymbol{A}\colon\boldsymbol{B} = \mathrm{tr}\left(\boldsymbol{A}^T\cdot\boldsymbol{B}\right)$ and using the definition of $J_2=\frac{1}{2}\mathrm{tr}\left(\boldsymbol{s}\cdot\boldsymbol{s}\right)$

$$r = \sqrt{\mathrm{tr}\left(\boldsymbol{s}\cdot\boldsymbol{s}\right)} = \sqrt{2 J_2}$$

is a unit tensor in the direction of the radial component.

== Lode angle – angular coordinate $(\theta)$ ==
This plot demonstrates that an intuitive approximation for the Lode angle is the relative position of the middle principal stress $\lambda_m$ with respect to the low and high principal stresses.

The Lode angle can be considered, rather loosely, a measure of loading type. The Lode angle varies with respect to the middle eigenvalue of the stress. There are many definitions of Lode angle that each utilize different trigonometric functions: the positive sine (It is incorrect (false) information that Chakrabarty defines shear stress mode angle with sin(Teta). Chakrabarty adopted Lode parameter with opposite sign than it has in the original Lode paper from 1926, see Page 59, formula (3) in the book «Chakrabarty, Jagabanduhu; 2006, Theory of Plasticity: Third edition, Elsevier, Amsterdam.». Effectively Chakrabarty shear stress mode angle is defined with -sin(Teta) just like it did for the first time Novozhilov in his work from 1951, Novozhilov 183-194, «О СВЯЗИ МЕЖДУ НАПРЯЖЕНИЯМИ И ДЕФОРМАЦИЯМИ В НЕЛИНЕЙНО УПРУГОЙ СРЕДЕ» (On relations between stresses and strains in non-linear elastic media) from 1951. The first work in which arguments and discussion is delivered why it is wise and useful to define shear stress mode angle with sin(Teta) is the Ziolkowski’s work «Parametrization of Cauchy Stress Tensor Treated as Autonomous Object Using Isotropy Angle and Skewness Angle» from 2022, https://et.ippt.pan.pl/index.php/et/article/view/2210. Accepting definition with sin(3Teta) in fact means that pure shears are accepted as comparison reference states, what has serious consequences.), negative sine, and positive cosine (here denoted $\theta_s$, $\bar{\theta}_s$, and $\theta_c$, respectively)

$$\sin(3\theta_s) = -\sin(3\bar{\theta}_{s}) = \cos(3\theta_c) = \frac{J_3}{2}\left(\frac{3}{J_2}\right)^{3/2}$$

and are related by

$$\theta_s = \frac{\pi}{6} - \theta_c
\qquad \qquad
\theta_s = -\bar{\theta}_s$$

Derivation
The relation between $\theta_c$ and $\theta_s$ can be shown by applying a trigonometric identity relating sine and cosine by a shift

$$\cos(3\theta_c)=\sin(3\theta_s)$$
$$\cos(3\theta_c)=\sin\left(\left(3\theta_s - \frac{\pi}{2}\right) + \frac{\pi}{2} \right)$$
$$\cos(3\theta_c) = \cos\left(3\theta_s - \frac{\pi}{2}\right)$$.

Because cosine is an even function and the range of the inverse cosine is usually $0\leq\cos^{-1}(\theta)\leq 1$ we take the negative possible value for the $\theta_s$ term, thus ensuring that $\theta_c$ is positive.

$$3\theta_c = \pm \left( 3\theta_s - \frac{\pi}{2}\right)$$
$$\theta_c = \frac{\pi}{6} - \theta_s$$

These definitions are all defined for a range of $\pi/3$.

	Stress State $\sigma_1 \geq \sigma_2 \geq \sigma_3$	$\theta_s$	$\bar{\theta}_s$	$\theta_c$
range		$-\frac{\pi}{6} \leq \theta_s \leq \frac{\pi}{6}$	$-\frac{\pi}{6} \leq \theta_s \leq \frac{\pi}{6}$	$0 \leq \theta_c \leq \frac{\pi}{3}$
Triaxial Compression (TXC)	$\sigma_1 \geq \sigma_2 = \sigma_3$	$-\frac{\pi}{6}$	$\frac{\pi}{6}$	$\frac{\pi}{3}$
Shear (SHR)	$\sigma_2=(\sigma_1+\sigma_3)/2$	$0$	$0$	$\frac{\pi}{6}$
Triaxial Extension (TXE)	$\sigma_1 = \sigma_2 \geq \sigma_3$	$\frac{\pi}{6}$	$-\frac{\pi}{6}$	$0$

The unit normal in the angular direction which completes the orthonormal basis can be calculated for $\theta_s$ and $\theta_c$ using

$$\boldsymbol{E_{\theta s}} = \frac{\boldsymbol{T}/\lVert\boldsymbol{T}\rVert - \sin(3\theta_s)\boldsymbol{E_r}}{\cos(3
\theta_s)}
\qquad
\boldsymbol{E_{\theta c}} = \frac{\boldsymbol{T}/\lVert\boldsymbol{T}\rVert - \cos(3\theta_c)\boldsymbol{E_r}}{\sin(3\theta_c)}$$.

== Meridional profile ==
This plot shows a typical meridional profile of several plasticity models: von Mises, linear Drucker–Prager, Mohr–Coulomb, Gurson, and Bigoni–Piccolroaz. The upper portion of the plot depicts yield surface behavior in triaxial extension and the lower portion depicts yield surface behavior in triaxial compression.

The meridional profile is a 2D plot of $(z,r)$ holding $\theta$ constant and is sometimes plotted using scalar multiples of $(z,r)$. It is commonly used to demonstrate the pressure dependence of a yield surface or the pressure-shear trajectory of a stress path. Because $r$ is non-negative the plot usually omits the negative portion of the $r$-axis, but can be included to illustrate effects at opposing Lode angles (usually triaxial extension and triaxial compression).

One of the benefits of plotting the meridional profile with $(z,r)$ is that it is a geometrically accurate depiction of the yield surface. If a non-isomorphic pair is used for the meridional profile then the normal to the yield surface will not appear normal in the meridional profile. Any pair of coordinates that differ from $(z,r)$ by constant multiples of equal absolute value are also isomorphic with respect to principal stress space. As an example, pressure $p=-I1/3$ and the Von Mises stress $\sigma_v = \sqrt{3J_2}$ are not an isomorphic coordinate pair and, therefore, distort the yield surface because

$$p = -\frac{1}{\sqrt{3}}z$$

$$\sigma_v = \sqrt{\frac{3}{2}} r$$

and, finally, $|-1/\sqrt{3}| \neq |\sqrt{3/2}|$.

== Octahedral profile ==
This plot shows a typical octahedral profile of several plasticity models: von Mises, linear Drucker–Prager, Mohr–Coulomb, Gurson, and Bigoni–Piccolroaz. This plot has omitted Lode angle values in favor of loading descriptions because of the preponderance of definitions of the Lode angle. The radial coordinate is $r=\sqrt{2J_2}$.

The octahedral profile is a 2D plot of $(r,\theta)$ holding $z$ constant. Plotting the yield surface in the octahedral plane demonstrates the level of Lode angle dependence. The octahedral plane is sometimes referred to as the 'pi plane' or 'deviatoric plane'.

The octahedral profile is not necessarily constant for different values of pressure with the notable exceptions of the von Mises yield criterion and the Tresca yield criterion which are constant for all values of pressure.

== A note on terminology ==
The term Haigh-Westergaard space is ambiguously used in the literature to mean both the Cartesian principal stress space and the cylindrical Lode coordinate space

== See also ==
- Yield (engineering)
- Plasticity (physics)
- Stress
- Henri Tresca
- von Mises stress
- Mohr–Coulomb theory
- Strain
- Strain tensor
- Stress–energy tensor
- Stress concentration
- 3-D elasticity
