= Hartman effect =

Physical effect used in quantum mechanics

The Hartman effect describes how the delay time for a quantum tunneling particle is independent of the thickness of the opaque barrier. It is named after Thomas E. Hartman, who discovered it in 1962.

== Overview ==
The Hartman effect is the tunneling effect through a barrier where the tunneling time tends to a constant for thick enough barriers. This was first described by Thomas E. Hartman in 1962. Although the effect was first predicted for quantum particles governed by the Schrödinger equation, it also exists for classical electromagnetic wave packets tunneling as evanescent waves through electromagnetic barriers. This is because the Helmholtz equation for electromagnetic waves and the time-independent Schrödinger equation have the same form. Since tunneling is a wave phenomenon, it occurs for all kinds of waves - matter waves, electromagnetic waves, and even sound waves. Hence the Hartman effect should exist for all tunneling waves.

There is no unique and universally accepted definition of "tunneling time" in physics. This is because time is not an operator in quantum mechanics, unlike other quantities like position and momentum. Among the many candidates for "tunneling time" are (i) the group delay or phase time, (ii) the dwell time, (iii) the Larmor times, (iv) the Büttiker–Landauer time, and (v) the semiclassical time. Three of these tunneling times (group delay, dwell time, and Larmor time) exhibit the Hartman effect, in the sense that they saturate at a constant value as the barrier thickness is increased. If the tunneling time T remains fixed as the barrier thickness L is increased, then the tunneling velocity v = L/T will ultimately become unbounded. The Hartman effect thus leads to predictions of anomalously large, and even superluminal tunneling velocities in the limit of thick barriers. However, more recent rigorous analysis proves that the process is entirely subluminal.

== Experimental verification ==
Tunneling time experiments with quantum particles like electrons are extremely difficult, not only because of the timescales (attoseconds) and length scales (sub-nanometre) involved, but also because of possible confounding interactions with the environment that have nothing to do with the actual tunneling process itself. As a result, the only experimental observations of the Hartman effect have been based on electromagnetic analogs to quantum tunneling. The first experimental verification of the Hartman effect was by Enders and Nimtz, who used a microwave waveguide with a narrowed region that served as a barrier to waves with frequencies below the cutoff frequency in that region. They measured the frequency-dependent phase shift of continuous wave (cw) microwaves transmitted by the structure. They found that the frequency-dependent phase shift was independent of the length of the barrier region. Since the group delay (phase time) is the derivative of the phase shift with respect to frequency, this independence of the phase shift means that the group delay is independent of barrier length, a confirmation of the Hartman effect. They also found that the measured group delay was shorter than the transit time L/c for a pulse travelling at the speed of light c over the same barrier distance L in vacuum. From this, it was inferred that the tunneling of evanescent waves is superluminal, despite it is now known on rigorous mathematical grounds that the relativistic quantum tunneling (modeled using the Dirac equation) is a subluminal process.

At optical frequencies the electromagnetic analogs to quantum tunneling involve wave propagation in photonic bandgap structures and frustrated total internal reflection at the interface between two prisms in close contact. Spielmann, et al. sent 12 fs (FWHM) laser pulses through the stop band of a multilayer dielectric structure. They found that the measured group delay was independent of the number of layers, or equivalently, the thickness of the photonic barrier, thus confirming the Hartman effect for tunneling light waves. In another optical experiment, Longhi, et al. sent 380-ps wide laser pulses through the stop band of a fiber Bragg grating (FBG). They measured the group delay of the transmitted pulses for gratings of length 1.3 cm, 1.6 cm, and 2 cm and found that the delay saturated with length L in a manner described by the function tanh(qL), where q is the grating coupling constant. This is another confirmation of the Hartman effect. The inferred tunneling group velocity was faster than that of a reference pulse propagating in a fiber without a barrier and also increased with FBG length, or equivalently, the reflectivity.

In a different approach to optical tunneling, Balcou and Dutriaux measured the group delay associated with light transport across a small gap between two prisms. When a light beam travelling through a prism impinges upon the glass-air interface at an angle greater than a certain critical angle, it undergoes total internal reflection and no energy is transmitted into the air. However, when another prism is brought very close (within a wavelength) to the first prism, light can tunnel across the gap and carry energy into the second prism. This phenomenon is known as frustrated total internal reflection (FTIR) and is an optical analog of quantum tunneling. Balcou and Dutriaux obtained the group delay from a measurement of the beam shift (known as the Goos–Hänchen shift) during FTIR. They found that the group delay saturates with the separation between the prisms, thus confirming the Hartman effect. They also found that the group delays were equal for both transmitted and reflected beams, a result that is predicted for symmetric barriers.

The Hartman effect has also been observed with acoustic waves. Yang, et al. propagated ultrasound pulses through 3d phononic crystals made of tungsten carbide beads in water. For frequencies inside the stop band they found that the group delay saturated with sample thickness. By converting the delay to a velocity through v = L/T, they found a group velocity that increases with sample thickness. In another experiment, Robertson, et al. created a periodic acoustic waveguide structure with an acoustic bandgap for audio frequency pulses. They found that inside the stop band the acoustic group delay was relatively insensitive to the length of the structure, a verification of the Hartman effect. Furthermore, the group velocity increased with length and was greater than the speed of sound, a phenomenon they refer to as "breaking the sound barrier."

== Origin ==
Why does the tunneling time of a particle or wave packet become independent of barrier width for thick enough barriers? The origin of the Hartman effect had been a mystery for decades. If the tunneling time becomes independent of barrier width, the implication is that the wave packet speeds up as the barrier is made longer. Not only does it speed up, but it speeds up by just the right amount to traverse the increased distance in the same amount of time. In 2002 Herbert Winful showed that the group delay for a photonic bandgap structure is identical to the dwell time which is proportional to the stored energy in the barrier. In fact, the dwell time is the stored energy divided by the input power. In the stop band, the electric field is an exponentially decaying function of distance. The stored energy is proportional to the integral of the square of the field. This integral, the area under a decaying exponential, becomes independent of length for a long enough barrier. The group delay saturates because the stored energy saturates. He redefined the group delay in tunneling as the lifetime of stored energy escaping through both ends. This interpretation of group delay as a lifetime also explains why the transmission and reflection group delays are equal for a symmetric barrier. He pointed out that the tunnelling time is not a propagation delay and "should not be linked to a velocity since evanescent waves do not propagate". In other papers Winful extended his analysis to quantum (as opposed to electromagnetic) tunneling and showed that the group delay is equal to the dwell time plus a self-interference delay, both of which are proportional to the integrated probability density and hence saturate with barrier length.

== See also ==
- Faster-than-light § Hartman effect
