= J. S. E. Townsend =

British physicist (1868–1957)

Sir J. S. E. Townsend FRS
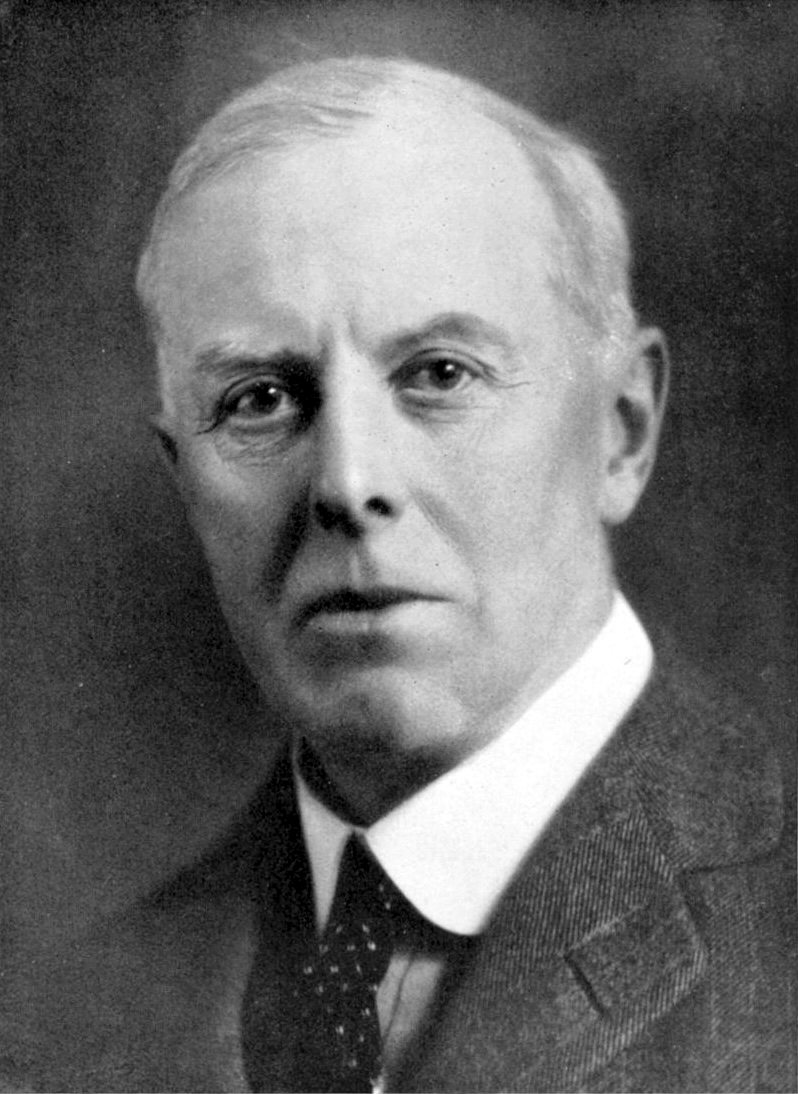
- Born: John Sealy Edward Townsend; 7 June 1868; Galway, Ireland
- Died: 16 February 1957 (aged 88); Oxford, England
- Education: University of Dublin: BA, Mathematics; University of Cambridge: MA (Cantab)
- Known for: Townsend discharge; Ramsauer–Townsend effect
- Spouse: Mary Georgiana Lambert (m. 1911)
- Children: 2
- Awards: Hughes Medal (1914)
- Scientific career
- Fields: Physics
- Workplaces: University of Oxford
- Academic advisors: J. J. Thomson
- Doctoral students: Victor Albert Bailey; Henry Brose; Robert J. Van de Graaff

Sir John Sealy Edward Townsend (7 June 1868 – 16 February 1957) was a British physicist who conducted various studies concerning the electrical conduction of gases (concerning the kinetics of electrons and ions) and directly measured the electric charge of the electron. He served as the first Wykeham Professor of Physics at the University of Oxford from 1900 until 1941.

== Education ==
John Sealy Edward Townsend was born on 7 June 1868 in Galway, Ireland, the second son of distant cousins, Judith and Edward Townsend. His father was Professor of Civil Engineering at Queen's College, Galway (now the University of Galway).

In 1885, Townsend entered Trinity College Dublin to study mathematics, mathematical physics, and experimental science. He was awarded a Foundation Scholarship in 1888, and graduated in 1890 with a double moderatorship and first place in Mathematics. In 1895, he went to Trinity College, Cambridge, as a research student of J. J. Thomson in the Cavendish Laboratory, where he supplied important work to the electrical conductivity of gases (now known as the Townsend discharge). This work determined the elementary charge with the droplet method; this method was improved later by Robert Millikan. He received a Bachelor of Arts in 1897, was made a Clerk Maxwell Scholar in 1898, and was elected a Fellow of Trinity College in 1899. He obtained a Master of Arts in 1903. From 1899 to 1900, Townsend was an Assistant University Demonstrator in the Cavendish Laboratory.

== Career in Oxford ==
In 1900, Townsend was appointed to the newly established Wykeham Professorship of Physics at the University of Oxford.

In 1901, Townsend discovered the ionisation of molecules by ion impact and the dependence of the mean free path on electrons (in gases) of the energy (and his independent studies concerning the collisions between atoms and low-energy electrons in the 1920s would later be called the Ramsauer–Townsend effect).

Townsend was a laboratory demonstrator when Brebis Bleaney was an undergraduate. Bleaney recounts an occasion when Townsend gathered together all the demonstrators and proceeded to refute both quantum mechanics and relativity.

Between the two world wars, Townsend led an effective small group of researchers, often Rhodes Scholars, of whom some became distinguished physicists. However, by the 1930s, he had become less effective; he was seen as a boring lecturer, a dogmatic supervisor, and out of touch with the wider world of physics. As the 1930s went on, no German refugees sought refuge in his laboratory, while Professor Frederick Lindemann gained 8 refugee physicists, some of whom gave his department an international reputation in the world of low temperature physics. In the late 1930s, the university decided to build a new Clarendon Laboratory building and looked closely at the relations between Oxford's two physics laboratories. There was a suggestion to convert the Wykeham Chair into one for theoretical physics.

In 1941, Townsend's career came to an unhappy end; he had refused to support the war effort by teaching service-men, and the university appointed a visitorial board. This found him guilty of misconduct and advised him that he would be dismissed unless he agreed to resign. He was knighted in January and resigned in September, subject to confidentiality.

== Personal life and death ==
On 5 June 1911 in Dublin, Townsend married Mary Georgiana Lambert. They had two sons, Edward (born 7 August 1912) and John (born 7 June 1914). The family lived at 20 Merton Street, Oxford.

Townsend died on 16 February 1957 in Oxford at the age of 88.

== Recognition ==
=== Memberships ===
Year	Organisation	Type	Ref.
1903	Royal Society	Fellow	

=== Awards ===
Year	Organisation	Award	Citation	Ref.
1914	Royal Society	Hughes Medal	"For his researches on electric induction in gases."	

=== Honours ===
Year	Country	Honour	Ref.
1941	United Kingdom	Knight Bachelor	

== Commemoration ==
The Townsend Building of the Clarendon Laboratory at the University of Oxford is named after him, as well as the townsend unit.

== Books ==
- Townsend, J. S. (1910). The Theory of Ionisation of Gases by Collision. Constable & Co., London.
- Townsend, J. S. (1915). Electricity in Gases. Clarendon Press, Oxford.
- Townsend, J. S. (1925). Motion of Electrons in Gases. OCLC 499998759.
- Townsend, J. S. (1943). Electricity and Radio Transmission. OCLC 2196307.
- Townsend, J. S. (1951). Electromagnetic Waves. OCLC 5691111.
