= Carl Ramsauer =

German physicist (1879–1955)

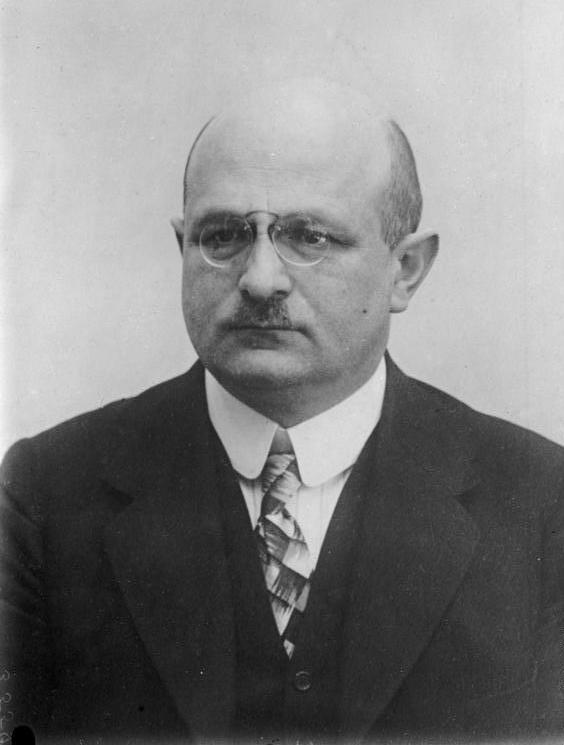
- Ramsauer in 1928
- Born: Carl Wilhelm Ramsauer; 6 February 1879; Oldenburg, German Empire
- Died: 24 December 1955 (aged 76); West Berlin, West Germany
- Education: Kiel University: Dr. phil., Physics; Heidelberg University: Dr. habil., Physics
- Known for: Ramsauer–Townsend effect
- Scientific career
- Fields: Physics
- Workplaces: Heidelberg University; Technical University of the Free City of Danzig; Allgemeine Elektrizitäts-Gesellschaft; Technische Hochschule zu Berlin
- Thesis: Ueber den Ricochetschuss (1903)
- Doctoral advisor: Leonhard Weber

Carl Wilhelm Ramsauer (German: [ˈʁamsaʊɐ]; 6 February 1879 – 24 December 1955) was a German physicist known for the discovery of the Ramsauer–Townsend effect. He pioneered the field of electron and proton collisions with gas molecules.

== Biography ==
Carl Wilhelm Ramsauer was born on 6 February 1879 in Osternburg, Oldenburg, German Empire. From 1897 to 1901, he studied mathematics and physics at the universities of Munich, Tübingen, and Berlin. In 1901, he entered Kiel University, where he received a Doctor of Philosophy in 1903 for a thesis on the ricochet shot.

In 1907, Ramsauer became a research assistant to Philipp Lenard in the Radiological Institute at Heidelberg University. It was here, in 1919, that he conducted research on the quantum effect of the transparency of noble gases to slow electrons (now known as the Ramsauer–Townsend effect). He completed his habilitation in 1909, and was made an associate professor in 1915. In 1921, he was appointed Professor of Experimental Physics at the Technical University of the Free City of Danzig (now the Gdańsk University of Technology).

From 1928 to 1945, Ramsauer was Director of the Research Institute of the Allgemeine Elektricitäts-Gesellschaft (AEG) in Berlin. In 1930, he became a member of the AEG Board of Directors. From 1931 to 1945, he was as an honorary professor of physics in Faculty I for General Sciences at Technische Hochschule zu Berlin (now Technische Universität Berlin). He was Professor of Experimental Physics at TH Berlin from 1946 until his retirement in 1952.

From 1937, Ramsauer was chairman of the Berlin Section of the German Physical Society (DPG), and from 1940 to 1945 the general chairman, i.e., president of the entire DPG. As president, Ramsauer and his deputy Wolfgang Finkelnburg took an independent course of action from the party line and against Deutsche Physik, which was anti-Semitic and had a bias against theoretical physics, especially including quantum mechanics. In taking this stance, they were supported by others, including Max Wien and Ludwig Prandtl.

Early in 1942, as chairman of the DPG, Ramsauer, with the support of Prandtl, submitted a petition to Reich Minister Bernhard Rust, at the Reichserziehungsministerium (Reich Education Ministry). The petition, a letter and six attachments, addressed the atrocious state of physics instruction in Germany, which Ramsauer concluded was the result of politicization of education.

Ramsauer was editor of the journals Zeitschrift für technische Physik and Physik in regelmässigen Berichten. The former journal, founded in 1919, was directed to industrial physicists and engineers, and it was a publication of the German Society of Technical Physics (Deutsche Gesellschaft für technische Physik). The latter journal, founded in 1933, was a supplement to the Zeitschrift für technische Physik.

Ramsauer died on 24 December 1955 in Berlin at the age of 76.

== Internal report ==
The following was published in Kernphysikalische Forschungsberichte (Research Reports in Nuclear Physics), an internal publication of the German Uranverein. Reports in this publication were classified Top Secret, they had very limited distribution, and the authors were not allowed to keep copies. The reports were confiscated under the Allied Operation Alsos and sent to the United States Atomic Energy Commission for evaluation. In 1971, the reports were declassified and returned to Germany. The reports are available at the Karlsruhe Nuclear Research Center and the American Institute of Physics.

- Carl Ramsauer Über Leistung und Organisation der angelsächsischen Physik: Mit Ausblicken für die deutsche Physik 2 April 1943. G-241.

== Books ==
- Carl Ramsauer Physik, Technik, Pädagogik (Braun, 1949)
- Carl Ramsauer Grundversuche der Physik in historischer Darstellung. Bd. 1. Von den Fallgesetzen bis zu den elektrischen Wellen (Springer, 1953)
- Carl Ramsauer Rudolf Kollath, and Ernst Brüche Wirkungsquerschnitt der Edelgase gegenüber langsamen Elektronen (Geest & Portig, 1954)
- Theodor Pöschl, Carl Ramsauer, and Ernst Brüche Die Physik in Einzelberichten. H. 1. Mechanik (J. A. Barth, 1956)
- Heinz Thiede, Carl Ramsauer, and Ernst Brüche Die Physik in Einzelberichten. H. 2. Praktische Akustik (J. A. Barth, 1957)
- Helmut Moser, Carl Ramsauer, and Ernst Brüche Die Physik in Einzelberichten. H. 3. Wärmelehre 1. Mit Beitr. (J. A. Barth, 1957)

== Selected publications ==
- Carl Ramsauer Über den Wirkungsquerschnitt der Gasmoleküle gegenüber langsamen Elektronen, Annalen der Physik (4) 64 513–540 (1921). (Received 7 September 1920, published in issue No. 6 of 31 March 1921.)

== Honors ==
- The Carl-Ramsauer Award by the German Physical Society was instituted in honor of Ramsauer's pioneering work in industrial physics research.
