= Maarten Schmidt =

Dutch-American astronomer (1929–2022)

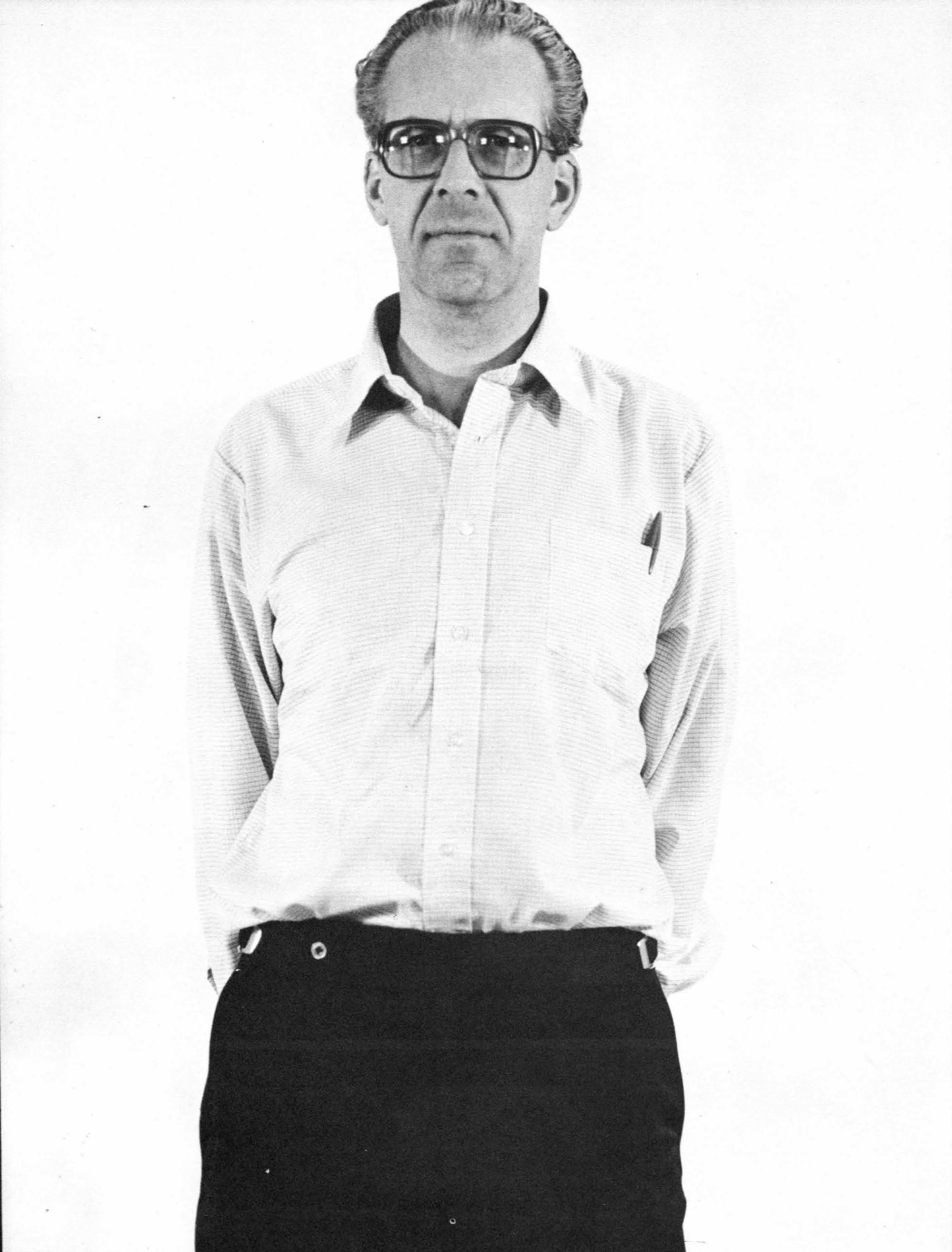
- Schmidt in 1978
- Born: 28 December 1929; Groningen, Netherlands
- Died: 17 September 2022 (aged 92); Fresno, California, U.S.
- Education: Leiden Observatory
- Known for: Quasars
- Awards: Karl Schwarzschild Medal (1968); Kavli Prize (2008)
- Scientific career
- Fields: Astronomy
- Workplaces: California Institute of Technology
- Doctoral advisor: Jan Oort

Maarten Schmidt (28 December 1929 – 17 September 2022) was a Dutch-born American astronomer who first measured the distances of quasars. He was the first astronomer to identify a quasar, and so was pictured on the March cover of Time magazine in 1966.

== Early life ==
Schmidt was born in Groningen, The Netherlands, on 28 December 1929. His father, Wilhelm, worked as an accountant for the Dutch government; his mother, Annie Wilhelmina (Haringhuizen), was a housewife. Schmidt studied math and physics at the University of Groningen, graduating with a bachelor's degree in 1949 before obtaining a master's degree the following year. He then commenced doctoral studies at Leiden University under Jan Oort. Schmidt was awarded a Doctor of Philosophy from Leiden Observatory in 1956.

== Career ==
After completing his doctorate, Schmidt resided in the United States for two years on a Carnegie Fellowship. He returned briefly to the Netherlands, but ultimately emigrated to the US on a permanent basis in 1959 to work at the California Institute of Technology. In the beginning, he worked on theories about the mass distribution and dynamics of galaxies. Of particular note from this period was his formulation of what has become known as the Schmidt law, which relates the density of interstellar gas to the rate of star formation occurring in that gas. He later began a study of the light spectra of radio sources. In 1963, using the 200-inch reflector telescope at the Palomar Observatory, Schmidt identified the visible object corresponding to one of these radio sources, known as 3C 273 and also studied its spectrum. While its star-like appearance suggested it was relatively nearby, the spectrum of 3C 273 proved to have what was at the time a high redshift of 0.158, showing that it lay far beyond the Milky Way, and thus possessed an extraordinarily high luminosity. Schmidt termed 3C 273 a "quasi-stellar" object or quasar; thousands have since been identified.

Schmidt was featured on the cover of Time magazine in March 1966. He was later a co-recipient, with Donald Lynden-Bell, of the inaugural Kavli Prize for Astrophysics in 2008.

He lectured a total of 33 times at the Summer Science Program.

== Personal life ==
Schmidt married Cornelia Tom in 1955. They met at a party hosted by Oort, and remained married until her death in 2020. Together, they had three daughters: Anne, Elizabeth, and Marijke.

Schmidt died on 17 September 2022 at his home in Fresno, California. He was 92 years old.

== Honors ==
Awards

- Helen B. Warner Prize (1964)
- Front cover of Time 11 March 1966
- Member of the American Academy of Arts and Sciences (1969)
- Henry Norris Russell Lectureship (1978)
- Member of the National Academy of Sciences (1978)
- Gold Medal of the Royal Astronomical Society (1980)
- Golden Plate Award of the American Academy of Achievement (1980)
- Correspondent of the Royal Netherlands Academy of Arts and Sciences (1980)
- James Craig Watson Medal (1991)
- Bruce Medal (1992)
- Member of the German Academy of Sciences Leopoldina (1995)
- Member of the American Philosophical Society (2000)
- Kavli Prize for Astrophysics (2008)
- Member of the Norwegian Academy of Science and Letters.

Named after him

- Asteroid 10430 Martschmidt
