= Baldwin effect (astronomy) =

Phenomenon in astronomy

The Baldwin effect in astronomy describes a relationship between continuum and emission-line fluxes observed in the electromagnetic spectra of quasars and active galactic nuclei, namely an anticorrelation between the equivalent width, W_{λ}, of a spectral line and the continuum luminosity, L, in broad UV optical emission lines. This means that the ratio of brightness of the emission line to the brightness of the nearby continuum decreases with increasing luminosity of the continuum.

== Discovery and observations ==
The effect was discovered in observations of high-redshift quasars reported in 1977, and has been commonly named after the discoverer Jack Allen Baldwin, an astronomer at Lick Observatory. It was found that the equivalent width of the broad ultraviolet C IV (λ 1549) emission line, caused by the presence of thrice ionised carbon C^{3+}, decreased with increasing continuum luminosity of the source. For flat-spectrum, radio-loud quasars the relation

$W_\lambda \propto L^{-2/3}$

was found.

The same effect has been observed for other spectral lines such as the Ly-α hydrogen line and the C III] (λ 1909) line of twice ionised carbon. It has also been found for spectral lines in the infrared range, e.g. in several Seyfert galaxies.

== Explanation ==
More or less satisfactory explanations of the phenomenon have been attempted using photoionization models, continuum beaming, variability, or continuum shape. An adequate, but not exclusive explanation is offered as a consequence of the presence of massive accretion disks in the centres of active galaxies and quasars. However, a complete explanation is still outstanding.
