= Hubble–Reynolds law =

The Hubble–Reynolds law models the surface brightness of elliptical galaxies as

$$I(R) = \frac{I_0}{(1+R/R_H)^2}$$

Where $I(R)$ is the surface brightness at radius $R$, $I_0$ is the central brightness, and $R_H$ is the radius at which the surface brightness is diminished by a factor of 1/4. It is asymptotically similar to the De Vaucouleurs' law which is a special case of the Sersic profile for elliptical galaxies.

The law is named for the astronomers Edwin Hubble and John Henry Reynolds. It was first formulated by Reynolds in 1913 from his observations of galaxies (then still known as nebulae). It was later re-derived by Hubble in 1930 specifically in observations of elliptical galaxies.
