= Einstein–de Haas effect =

Consequence of the conservation of angular momentum

The Einstein–de Haas effect is a physical phenomenon in which a change in the magnetic moment of a free body causes the body to rotate. The effect is a consequence of the conservation of angular momentum. It is strong enough to be observable in ferromagnetic materials. The experimental observation and accurate measurement of the effect demonstrated that the phenomenon of magnetization is caused by the alignment (polarization) of the angular momenta of the electrons in the material along the axis of magnetization. These measurements also allow the separation of the two contributions to the magnetization: that which is associated with the spin from that which is due to the orbital motion of the electrons. The effect also demonstrated the close relation between the notions of angular momentum in classical and in quantum physics.

The effect was predicted by O. W. Richardson in 1908. It is named after Albert Einstein and Wander Johannes de Haas, who published two papers in 1915 claiming the first experimental observation of the effect.

== Description ==
The orbital motion of an electron (or any charged particle) around a certain axis produces a magnetic dipole with the magnetic moment of $\boldsymbol{\mu} = (e/2m) \cdot \mathbf{j},$ where $e$ and $m$ are the charge and the mass of the particle, while $\mathbf{j}$ is the angular momentum of the motion (SI units are used). In contrast, the intrinsic magnetic moment of the electron is related to its intrinsic angular momentum (spin) as $\boldsymbol{\mu} \approx{} 2\cdot{}(e/2m) \cdot \mathbf{j}$ (see Landé g-factor and anomalous magnetic dipole moment).

If a number of electrons in a unit volume of the material have a total orbital angular momentum of $\mathbf{J}_\text{o}$ with respect to a certain axis, their magnetic moments would produce the magnetization of $\mathbf{M}_\text{o} = (e/2m) \cdot \mathbf{J}_\text{o}$. For the spin contribution the relation would be $\mathbf{M}_\text{s} \approx (e/m) \cdot \mathbf{J}_\text{s}$. A change in magnetization, $\Delta\mathbf{M},$ implies a proportional change in the angular momentum, $\Delta\mathbf{J}\propto{}\Delta\mathbf{M},$ of the electrons involved. Provided that there is no external torque along the magnetization axis applied to the body in the process, the rest of the body (practically all its mass) should acquire an angular momentum $-\Delta\mathbf{J}$ due to the law of conservation of angular momentum.

== Experimental setup ==
Experimental setup

The experiments involve a cylinder of a ferromagnetic material suspended with the aid of a thin string inside a cylindrical coil which is used to provide an axial magnetic field that magnetizes the cylinder along its axis. A change in the electric current in the coil changes the magnetic field the coil produces, which changes the magnetization of the ferromagnetic cylinder and, due to the effect described, its angular momentum. A change in the angular momentum causes a change in the rotational speed of the cylinder, monitored using optical devices. The external field $\mathbf{B}$ interacting with a magnetic dipole $\boldsymbol{\mu}$ cannot produce any torque ($\boldsymbol{\tau} = \boldsymbol{\mu} \times \mathbf{B}$) along the field direction. In these experiments the magnetization happens along the direction of the field produced by the magnetizing coil, therefore, in absence of other external fields, the angular momentum along this axis must be conserved.

In spite of the simplicity of such a layout, the experiments are not easy. The magnetization can be measured accurately with the help of a pickup coil around the cylinder, but the associated change in the angular momentum is small. Furthermore, the ambient magnetic fields, such as the Earth field, can provide a 10^{7}–10^{8} times larger mechanical impact on the magnetized cylinder. The later accurate experiments were done in a specially constructed demagnetized environment with active compensation of the ambient fields. The measurement methods typically use the properties of the torsion pendulum, providing periodic current to the magnetization coil at frequencies close to the pendulum's resonance. The experiments measure directly the ratio: $\lambda =\Delta\mathbf{J}/\Delta\mathbf{M}$ and derive the dimensionless gyromagnetic factor $g'$ of the material from the definition: $g' \equiv{} \frac{2m}{e}\frac{1}{\lambda}$. The quantity $\gamma \equiv \frac{1}{\lambda} \equiv \frac{e}{2m}g'$ is called gyromagnetic ratio.

== History ==
The expected effect and a possible experimental approach was first described by Owen Willans Richardson in a paper published in 1908. The electron spin was discovered in 1925, therefore only the orbital motion of electrons was considered before that. Richardson derived the expected relation of $\mathbf{M} = (e/2m) \cdot \mathbf{J}$. The paper mentioned the ongoing attempts to observe the effect at Princeton University.

In that historical context the idea of the orbital motion of electrons in atoms contradicted classical physics. This contradiction was addressed in the Bohr model in 1913, and later was removed with the development of quantum mechanics.

Samuel Jackson Barnett, motivated by the Richardson's paper realized that the opposite effect should also happen – a change in rotation should cause a magnetization (the Barnett effect). He published the idea in 1909, after which he pursued the experimental studies of the effect.

Einstein and De Haas published two papers in April 1915 containing a description of the expected effect and the experimental results. In the paper "Experimental proof of the existence of Ampere's molecular currents" they described in details the experimental apparatus and the measurements performed. Their result for the ratio of the angular momentum of the sample to its magnetic moment (the authors called it $\lambda$) was very close (within 3%) to the expected value of $2m/e$. It was realized later that their result with the quoted uncertainty of 10% was not consistent with the correct value which is close to $m/e$. Apparently, the authors underestimated the experimental uncertainties.

Barnett reported the results of his measurements at several scientific conferences in 1914. In October 1915 he published the first observation of the Barnett effect in a paper titled "Magnetization by Rotation". His result for $\lambda$ was close to the right value of $m/e$, which was unexpected at that time.

In 1918 John Quincy Stewart published the results of his measurements confirming the Barnett's result. In his paper he was calling the phenomenon the 'Richardson effect'.

The following experiments demonstrated that the gyromagnetic ratio for iron is indeed close to $e/m$ rather than $e/2m$. This phenomenon, dubbed "gyromagnetic anomaly" was finally explained after the discovery of the spin and introduction of the Dirac equation in 1928.

The experimental equipment was later donated by Geertruida de Haas-Lorentz, wife of De Haas and daughter of Hendrik Lorentz, to the Ampère Museum in Lyon France in 1961. It went lost and was later rediscovered in 2023.

== Literature about the effect and its discovery ==
Detailed accounts of the historical context and the explanations of the effect can be found in literature Commenting on the papers by Einstein, Calaprice in The Einstein Almanac writes:

52. "Experimental Proof of Ampère's Molecular Currents" (Experimenteller Nachweis der Ampereschen Molekularströme) (with Wander J. de Hass). Deutsche Physikalische Gesellschaft, Verhandlungen 17 (1915): 152–170.

Considering [André-Marie] Ampère's hypothesis that magnetism is caused by the microscopic circular motions of electric charges, the authors proposed a design to test [Hendrik] Lorentz's theory that the rotating particles are electrons. The aim of the experiment was to measure the torque generated by a reversal of the magnetisation of an iron cylinder.

Calaprice further writes:

53. "Experimental Proof of the Existence of Ampère's Molecular Currents" (with Wander J. de Haas) (in English). Koninklijke Akademie van Wetenschappen te Amsterdam, Proceedings 18 (1915–16).

Einstein wrote three papers with Wander J. de Haas on experimental work they did together on Ampère's molecular currents, known as the Einstein–De Haas effect. He immediately wrote a correction to paper 52 (above) when Dutch physicist H. A. Lorentz pointed out an error. In addition to the two papers above [that is 52 and 53] Einstein and de Haas cowrote a "Comment" on paper 53 later in the year for the same journal. This topic was only indirectly related to Einstein's interest in physics, but, as he wrote to his friend Michele Besso, "In my old age I am developing a passion for experimentation."

The second paper by Einstein and De Haas was communicated to the "Proceedings of the Royal Netherlands Academy of Arts and Sciences" by Hendrik Lorentz. Einstein announced the work in a report to the German Physical Society (7 May 1915): "In the past three months I have performed experiments jointly with de Mr. de Haas–Lorentz in the Imperial Physicotechnical Institute, which in my opinion have firmly established the existence of Ampère molecular currents." Einstein was referring to Wander de Haas, who was married to Geertruida de Haas-Lorentz, theoretical physicist and daughter of Lorentz.

== Later measurements and applications ==
The effect was used to measure the properties of various ferromagnetic elements and alloys. The key to more accurate measurements was better magnetic shielding, while the methods were essentially similar to those of the first experiments. The experiments measure the value of the g-factor $g' =\frac{2m}{e}\frac{M}{J}$ (here we use the projections of the pseudovectors $\mathbf{M}$ and $\mathbf{J}$ onto the magnetization axis and omit the $\Delta$ sign). The magnetization and the angular momentum consist of the contributions from the spin and the orbital angular momentum: $M=M_\text{s}+M_\text{o}$, $J=J_\text{s}+J_\text{o}$.

Using the known relations $M_\text{o}=\frac{e}{2m}J_\text{o}$, and $M_\text{s}=g\cdot{}\frac{e}{2m}J_\text{s}$, where $g\approx{}2.002$ is the g-factor for the anomalous magnetic moment of the electron, one can derive the relative spin contribution to magnetization as: $\frac{M_\text{s}}{M}=\frac{(g'-1)g}{(g-1)g'}$.

For pure iron the measured value is $g'=1.919\pm{}0.002$, and $\frac{M_\text{s}}{M}\approx{}0.96$. Therefore, in pure iron 96% of the magnetization is provided by the polarization of the electrons' spins, while the remaining 4% is provided by the polarization of their orbital angular momenta.

== See also ==
- Barnett effect
