= Society of Friends of André-Marie Ampère =

SAAMA
- Society of Friends of André-Marie Ampère
- Société des Amis d’André-Marie Ampère
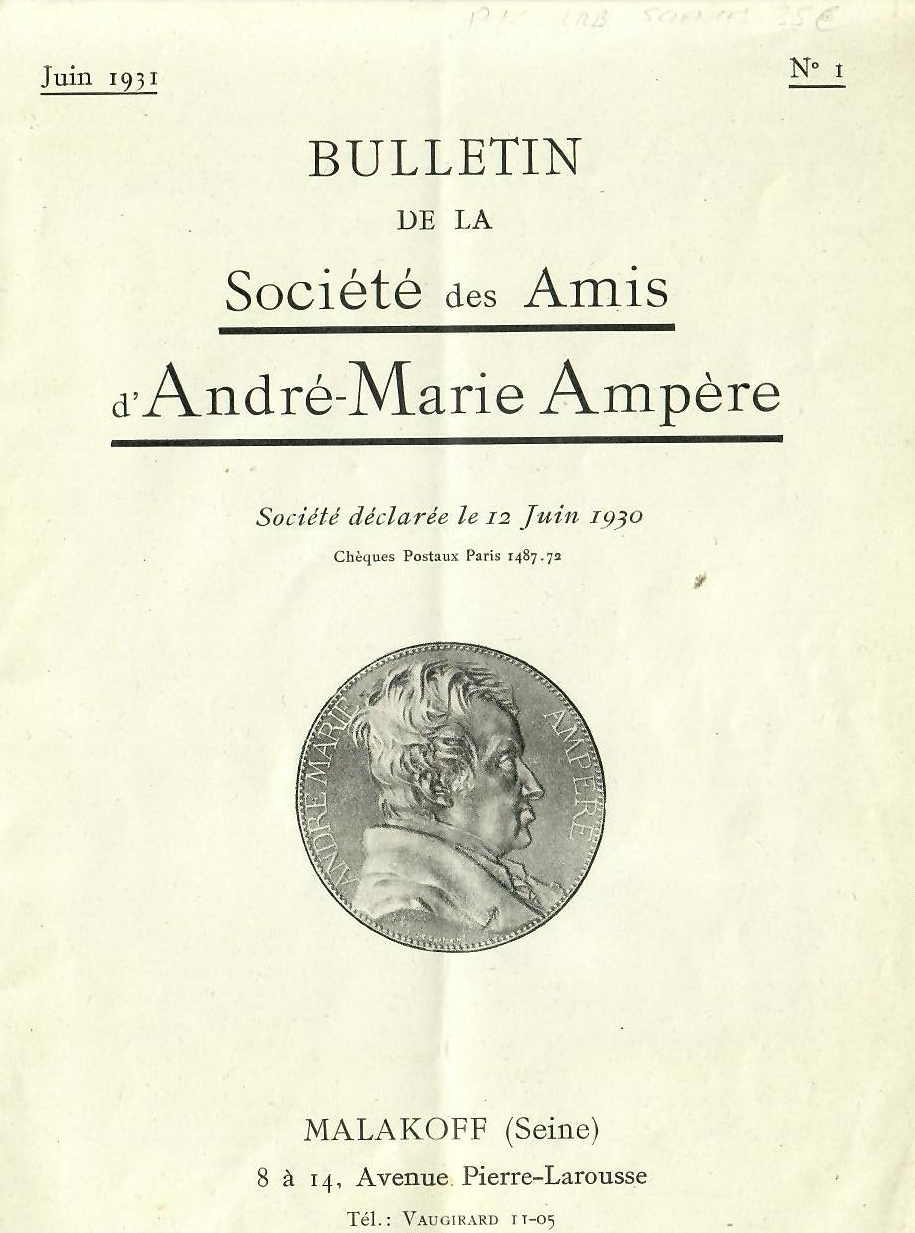
- Established: July 1, 1930; 95 years ago
- Type: Nonprofit
- Legal status: French public utility association
- Purpose: Cultural
- Headquarters: Ampère Museum
- Location: Poleymieux au Mont d’Or, France
- Coordinates: 45.854198°N 4.799212°E
- Region served: World
- Award: Honor medal of the Lyon Academy
- Website: https://saama.fr/

The Society of Friends of André-Marie Ampère (“Société des Amis d’André-Marie Ampère” in French, SAAMA) is a scholarly society whose aim is to contribute to perpetuating the memory of André-Marie Ampère through all means it deems appropriate, including conferences, publications, commemorations, collection of documents and apparatus, and the creation and development of a museum, the Ampère Museum. Founded in 1930 at the initiative of Paul Janet, a member of the French Academy of Sciences and Director of the “École Supérieure d'Électricité”, the society has been recognized as a public utility by French administration since 1936. In particular, SAAMA is responsible for the management and development of an Electricity Museum, located in Ampère's house in Poleymieux-au-Mont-d'Or, close to Lyon, known as the Ampère Museum. The French Society for Electricity, Electronics, and Information and Communication Technologies owns the premises and is a privileged partner of SAAMA. SAAMA also organizes exhibitions, workshops, and numerous events that contribute to raising awareness of André-Marie Ampère's contributions and disseminating scientific and technical knowledge about electromagnetism and its applications. It also takes care of the preservation and development of the Ampère House-Electricity Museum site. SAAMA also publishes an annual bulletin. The Society has been chaired by various personalities, including Louis Lumière, Georges Darrieus, Maurice Ponte, Paul Delouvrier, Maurice Jacob and Geneviève Comté-Bellot.

== History ==
In 1928, thanks to an international subscription organized by Paul Janet, member of the French Academy of Sciences, it was acquired the former property of André-Marie Ampère in Poleymieux-au-Mont-d'Or, which had just been put up for sale . This subscription received support from companies, associations, and prominent individuals, with the largest contribution coming from the Behn brothers. Hernand and Sosthenes Behn, American businessmen of French descent through their mother. The Behn brothers were the co-founders of the multinational company ITT, which was expanding its operations in France at that time. Although initially the house of André-Marie Ampère was intended to be donated to the French Academy of Sciences, it was eventually entrusted to the French Society of Electrical Engineers. On June 2, 1928, the Poleymieux house was inaugurated in the presence of numerous personalities. At the same initiative of Paul Janet, the Society of Friends of André-Marie Ampère (SAAMA) was founded on June 12, 1930, with the responsibility of managing the Ampère House and to create a museum. Among the founders of SAAMA were Émile Picard (Perpetual Secretary of the Academy of Sciences), Alfred Lacroix (Perpetual Secretary of the Academy of Sciences), André Blondel (Academy of Sciences), Gustave Ferrié (Academy of Sciences), Paul Janet (Academy of Sciences), Louis de Launay (Academy of Sciences), and Vito Volterra (Foreign Associate of the Academy of Sciences). The first president of SAAMA was Louis Lumière, with two honorary presidents, Raymond Poincaré (French Academy) and Edouard Herriot, Mayor of Lyon. The patronage committee established for the creation of SAAMA gathered numerous scientific personalities, including several Nobel laureates in physics such as William Henry Bragg (1915), Louis de Broglie (1929), Jean Perrin (1926), Pieter Zeeman (1902), and in chemistry, Victor Grignard (1912) and Paul Sabatier (chemist) (1912), as well as other renowned physicists and chemists such as Blas Cabrera, Aimé Cotton, Charles Fabry, Wander Johannes de Haas, Martin Knudsen, Paul Langevin and Henry Le Chatelier.

The Ampère Museum was inaugurated on July 1, 1931, and SAAMA was recognized as a French public utility society by decree on April 4, 1936.

== The SAAMA and the Ampère Museum ==
Since its foundation in 1930, the Society of Friends of André-Marie Ampère has been responsible for the management and development of an Electricity Museum, located in Ampère's house in Poleymieux-au-Mont-d'Or, known as the Ampère Museum or Ampère House-Electricity Museum. Throughout its history, SAAMA has undertaken numerous renovations and restorations of the building and its gardens, as well as the collection, acquisition, and development of objects and installations that make up the Ampère Museum collection, thanks to the contribution of numerous patrons and the dedication of the association's volunteers.

== Publications ==
The Society of Friends of André-Marie Ampère publishes books, videos, and an annual bulletin. Publications by the society (non-exhaustive list):

- "Correspondance du Grand Ampère" in 3 volumes from 1936 to 1943, Ampère, Author: André Marie (1775–1836). Scientific editors: Louis Auguste Alphonse and the Society of Friends of André-Marie Ampère.
- "Guide du Musée Ampère" by Robert Moïse, 3rd revised and enlarged edition - 1985 (63 pages).
- "Guide du Musée Ampère" by Robert Moïse, revised and expanded edition - 1996 (63 pages).
- "Le génial Bonhomme Ampère - Le Romain de sa vie" by Pierre Marion, 1999.
- "Bulletin de la Société des Amis d'André-Marie Ampère" from 1931.
- "L'homme à l'aimant" Collective work with contributions from SAAMA. Published by EMMC, (ISBN 9782357401235) - 2011.

== Distinctions ==
The Society of Friends of André Marie Ampère received the "2018 Medal of Honor" from the Academy of Sciences, Humanities and Arts of Lyon.

== Presidents ==
- Louis Lumière (1930–1941)
- Frédéric Hellot (1942–1947)
- Georges Darrieus (1948–1974)
- Maurice Ponte (1974–1979)
- Raymond Pelletier (1979–1985)
- Paul Delouvrier (1985–1994)
- Jean-Pierre Desgeorges (1994–1999)
- Jacques Lion (2000–2001)
- Maurice Jacob (2002–2005)
- Geneviève Comté-Bellot (2005–2020)
- Alfonso San Miguel (since 2021)

== General Delegates ==
- Eugène Dumont (1930–1940)
- Louis Domenach (1941–1967)
- Robert Moise (1973–1975)
- Louis Dupré-Latour (1967–1979)
- Joseph Janin (1979–1999)
- Georges Asch(2000–2010)
- Georges Delorme (2010–2015)
- Jean-Luc Rayon (2015–2020)
- Philippe Ponchon (2021–2022)

== Honorary Presidents ==
- Louis Lumière
- Georges Darrieus
- Geneviève Comte-Bellot

== See also ==
- Ampère Museum
