= List of things named after Hendrik Antoon Lorentz =

List of things named after Dutch physicist Hendrik Antoon Lorentz:

== Mathematics and science ==
- Abraham–Lorentz force
  - Abraham–Lorentz–Dirac Force
- Cauchy–Lorentz distribution
  - Lorentzian
- Drude–Lorentz model
- Fock–Lorentz symmetry
- Lorentz–Berthelot rules
- Lorentz covariance
  - Lorentz symmetry
- Lorentz–FitzGerald contraction
- Heaviside–Lorentz units
- Lorentz–Lorenz equation
- Lorentz aether theory
- Lorentz factor
- Lorentz force
- Lorentz force velocimetry
- Lorentz group
- Lorentz manifold
  - Lorentz metric
- Lorentz pendulum
- Lorentz oscillator model
- Lorentz scalar
- Lorentz surface
- Lorentz transformation
- Lorentz-violating electrodynamics
- Tauc–Lorentz model

== Others ==
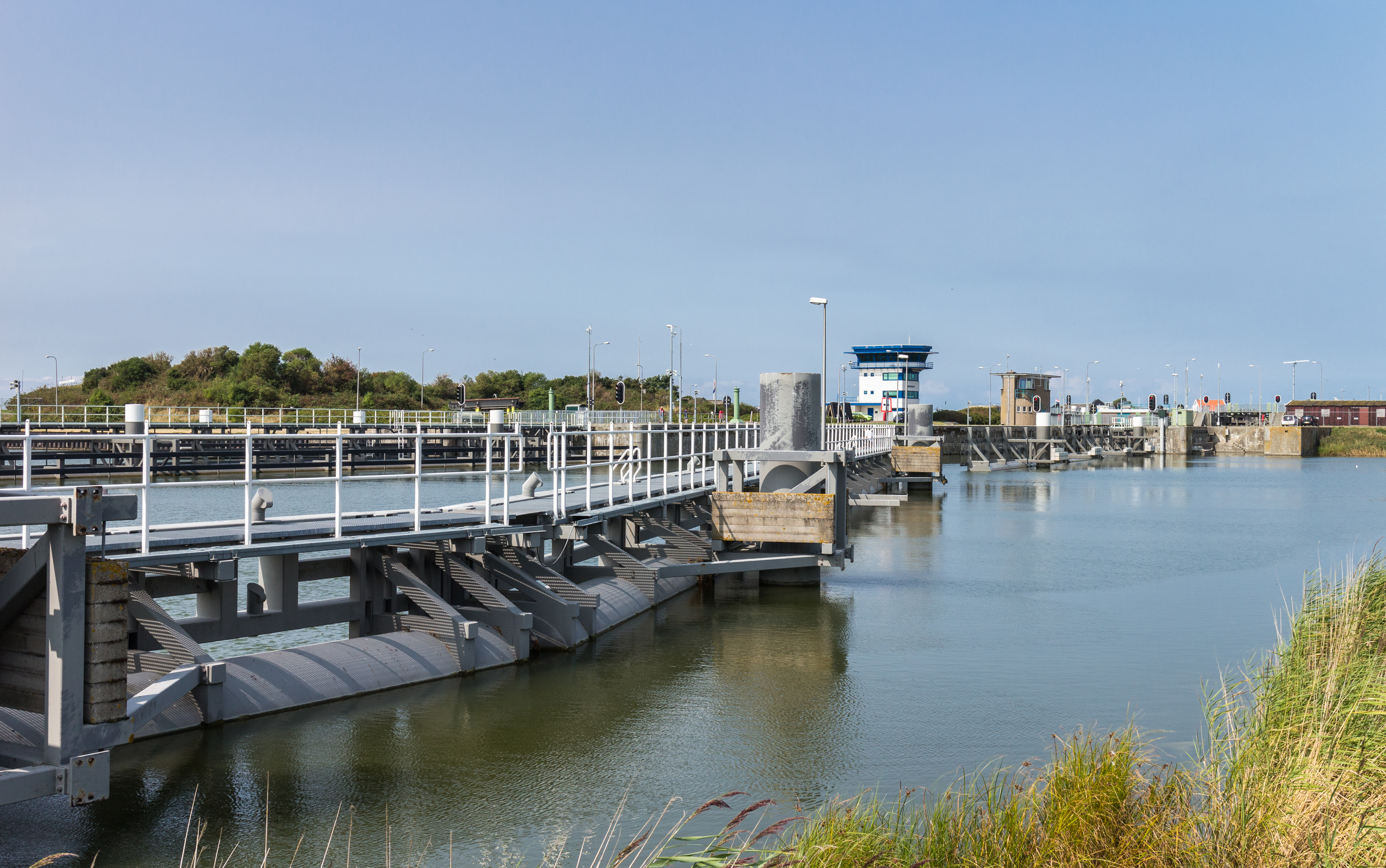
Overview of the Lorentzsluizen (Lorentz Locks) complex in the Afsluitdijk (Closing Dam), Kornwerderzand, the Netherlands, 2018.

- Lorentz Centre
- Lorentz (crater)
- Lorentz Institute
- Lorentz Medal
- Lorentz locks, lock in the Afsluitdijk in the Netherlands
- The Lorentz industrial zone (consisting of 4 areas: I, Haven (port), II and III) on the Veluwemeer northeast of Harderwijk, at over 240 hectares the largest contiguous industrial zone in the province of Gelderland in the Netherlands.
- Lorentz Casimir Lyceum (nl)
- Lorentz Driver (Exotic-tier Linear Fusion Rifle found in Destiny 2)
