= Gerardus J. Sizoo =

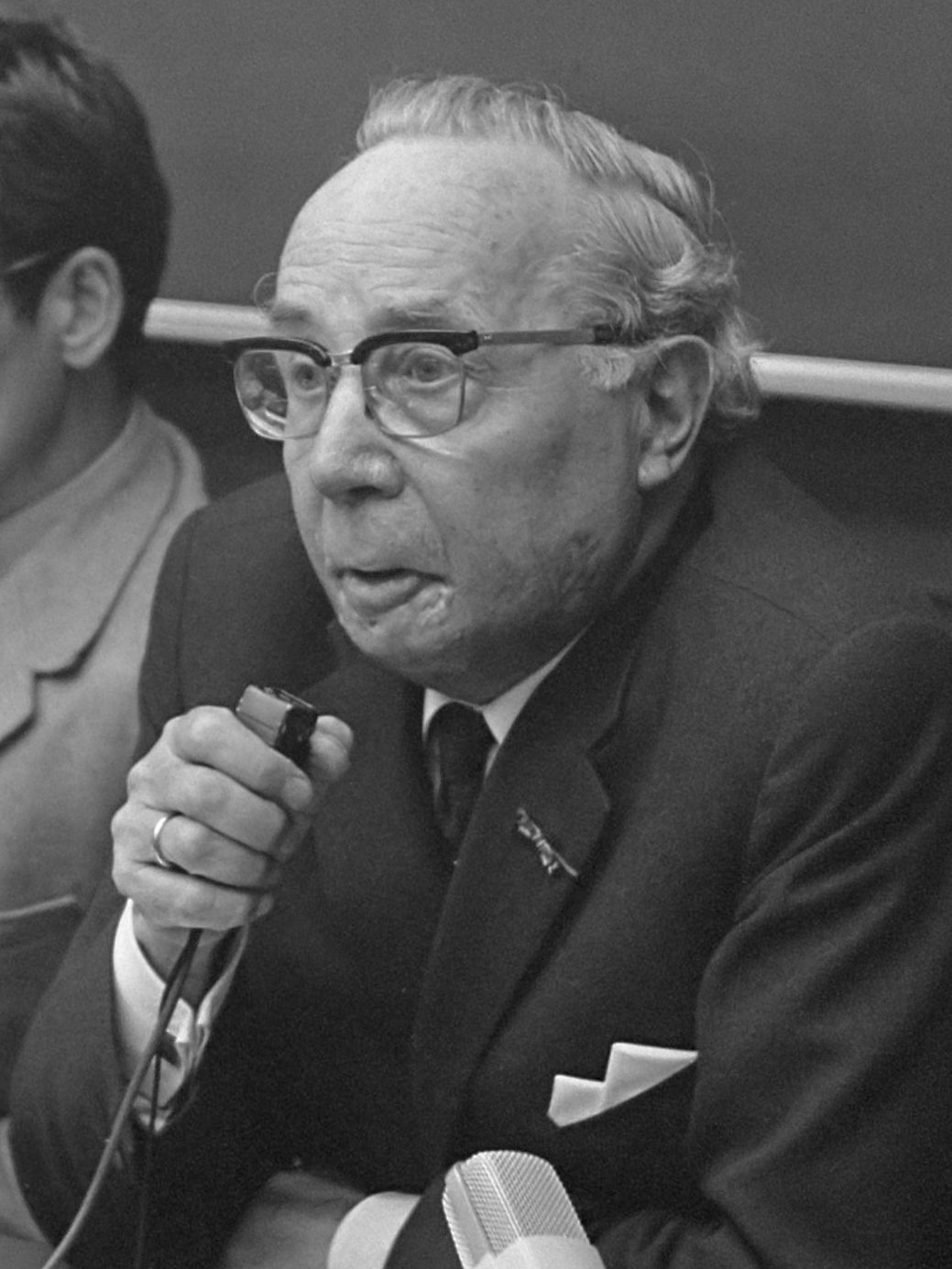
- Born: 8 November 1900; Woerden, Netherlands
- Died: 6 January 1994 (aged 93)
- Education: Universiteit Leiden
- Known for: Religion and science relationship
- Scientific career
- Fields: Physicist
- Workplaces: Vrije Universiteit
- Doctoral advisor: Wander Johannes de Haas
- Doctoral students: K. M. van Vliet

Gerardus Johannes Sizoo (8 November 1900 – 4 January 1994) was the first professor of physics at the Vrije Universiteit. He is notable for the establishment and development of the applied physics laboratory in 1930 and the establishment of the Faculty of Mathematics and Physics at the Vrije Universiteit.

== Education ==
His doctoral research explored the phenomenon of superconductivity at the University of Leiden, following the lead of Heike Kamerlingh Onnes and Wander Johannes de Haas. He completed his PhD in 1926, with a thesis entitled: Onderzoekingen over den suprageleidenden toestand van metalen, under Wander Johannes de Haas.

== Career ==
In as early as 1929, it was decided that Sizoo act as professor at the newly established Faculty of Mathematics and Physics. Despite his young age he was the only candidate who met the scientific requirements, the right beliefs, and had agreed to the task. Sizoo promoted the then emerging field of radioactivity, partly because there were no other laboratories in the Netherlands exploring this area depth. His own research focused on natural radioactive substances.

Sizoo faced a difficult relationship between the reformed religion and science, in the 1930s. He wrote many publications on this relationship. In 1943 the Vrije Universiteit closed its doors, and scientific work in the ensuing time was much more difficult, despite efforts by Sizoo to keep the laboratory equipment from the hands of German occupiers.

Shortly after 1945 Sizoo was one of the initiators of the creation of the Foundation for Fundamental Research on Matter. In addition, he held numerous positions in scientific institutes and committees. In 1965, at 65 years of age, Sizoo became an emeritus professor, and he continued writing on physics, the relationship between faith and science, and the significance of the science for the Christian foundation of the Vrije Universiteit.
