= Carolyne Van Vliet =

American physicist

- Born: December 27, 1929; Dordrecht, Netherlands
- Died: July 15, 2016 (aged 86); Miami, Florida, US
- Citizenship: American
- Education: Vrije Universiteit Amsterdam
- Awards: Fulbright (1956)
- Scientific career
- Fields: Physicist and electronic engineer
- Workplaces: University of Miami; Vrije Universiteit Amsterdam; Université de Montréal; University of Minnesota; Florida International University
- Doctoral advisor: Gerardus J. Sizoo
- Other academic advisors: Hendrik Casimir; Jan Blok

Carolyne Marina Van Vliet (1929 – 2016) was a Dutch-American physicist notable for the theory of generation-recombination noise and for the theory of quantum transport in non-equilibrium statistical mechanics, as well as for her many contributions to the foundations of linear response theory. She was a Fellow of the American Physical Society (APS) and of the Institute of Electrical and Electronics Engineers (IEEE).

== Education ==
Van Vliet obtained a BS in physics and mathematics from Vrije Universiteit, Amsterdam in 1949. Van Vliet then obtained an MA in physics from the same university in 1953, and a PhD in 1956 for a thesis titled Current Fluctuations in Semiconductors and Photoconductors, under Gerardus J. Sizoo.

== Personal life ==
As a teenager, Van Vliet lived in the Nazi-occupied Netherlands for 5 years. The name change from "K M van Vliet" to "C M Van Vliet" occurred in 1982. She moved to Minneapolis, Minnesota in 1956, then to Montreal, Quebec in 1969. Starting in 1995 she lived in Miami, Florida.

== Career ==
Van Vliet was a teaching assistant (1949–1953) at the Vrije Universiteit in Amsterdam, and then a NV Philips Research Fellow (1953–1956) at the same university. This was followed by an appointment as a Fulbright Fellow in the electrical engineering department at the University of Minnesota (1956–1957), where she rose to assistant professor. During 1958-1960, Van Vliet was appointed as 'Conservator' in the department of physics at the Vrije Universiteit and then was appointed at the University of Minnesota (1957–1970) rising to professor. In that time, she was an assistant professor (1957–58) and associate professor (1960–65) in the department of electrical engineering and a full professor (1965–70) in the department of physics. In 1969-1995, Van Vliet was professor of theoretical physics at the Centre de Recherches Mathématiques of the Université de Montréal. Then, during 1992-2000, she was a professor at Florida International University in Miami. Her last position was as adjunct professor of physics at the University of Miami. In her career, she actively visited other physics departments over the years which include the University of Utrecht in the Netherlands (1968, 1977) and the University of Florida in Gainesville, FL (1974, 1977, 1978–84).

She was a stellar researcher and teacher who specialized in the areas of non-equilibrium statistical mechanics, fluctuations and stochastic processes, quantum transport in condensed matter and electron behavior in nanoscale quantum devices during her career. These topics are relevant today in exploring the development of quantum computing and its applications. She published over 200 scientific publications and several books included a graduate textbook, "Equilibrium and Non-Equilibrium Statistical Mechanics". She also supervised and graduated over 28 PhD students from 1958 to 2000.

== Publications by Van Vliet ==
- K M van Vliet, Current Fluctuations in Semiconductors and Photoconductors, Ph.D. thesis, (copyrighted) Excelsior Press, The Hague, Netherlands, 1956.
- K M van Vliet, Elektronica, Collegedictaat, 1958 (copyright VU).
- K M van Vliet and J. R. Fassett " Fluctuations due to Electronic Transitions and Transport in Solids" in Fluctuation Phenomena in Solids (R.E. Burgess, Ed.), (copyright Academic Press) Academic Press, NY, 1965.
- Carolyne M. Van Vliet, "Ninth International Conference on Noise in Physical Systems" (Ed.), (copyright WSPC) World Scientific Publishing Company, Singapore 1987.
- Carolyne M. Van Vliet, Equilibrium and Non-equilibrium Statistical Mechanics, (copyright Carolyne M. Van Vliet) World Scientific Publishing Company, Singapore and New Jersey, 2008. ISBN 981-270-477-9 (Hardcover) and ISBN 981-270-478-7 (pbk).
