= Lorentz Institute =

Dutch theoretical physics institute

The Lorentz Institute (Dutch: Instituut-Lorentz) is the institute for theoretical physics at Leiden University the Netherlands. Established in 1921, it was named after physicist Hendrik Lorentz, the first professor of theoretical physics in the country. Together with the experimental physics groups in the Kamerlingh Onnes Laboratory and the Huygens Laboratory, it makes up the Leiden Institute of Physics. The Lorentz Institute participates in two research schools: the Casimir Research School (jointly with Delft University of Technology) and the Dutch Research School of Theoretical Physics.
