= Geertruida de Haas-Lorentz =

Dutch theoretical physicist (1885–1973)

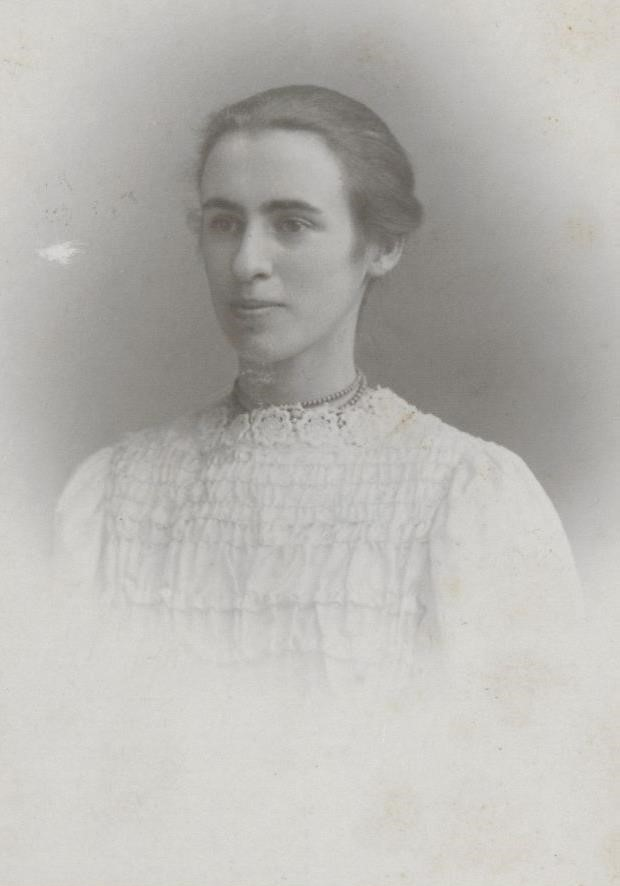
- De Haas-Lorentz, before 1909
- Born: Geertruida Luberta Lorentz; 20 October 1885; Leiden, South Holland, Netherlands
- Died: 2 January 1973 (aged 87); Leiden, South Holland, Netherlands
- Education: Leiden University (PhD)
- Known for: Postulating electrons as Brownian particles (1912); Postulating the London penetration depth (1925)
- Spouse: Wander de Haas (m. 1910; died 1960)
- Children: 4
- Father: Hendrik Lorentz
- Scientific career
- Fields: Condensed matter physics
- Workplaces: Technical University of Delft
- Thesis: Over de theorie van de Brown'sche beweging en daarmede verwante verschijnselen (1912)
- Doctoral advisor: Hendrik Lorentz

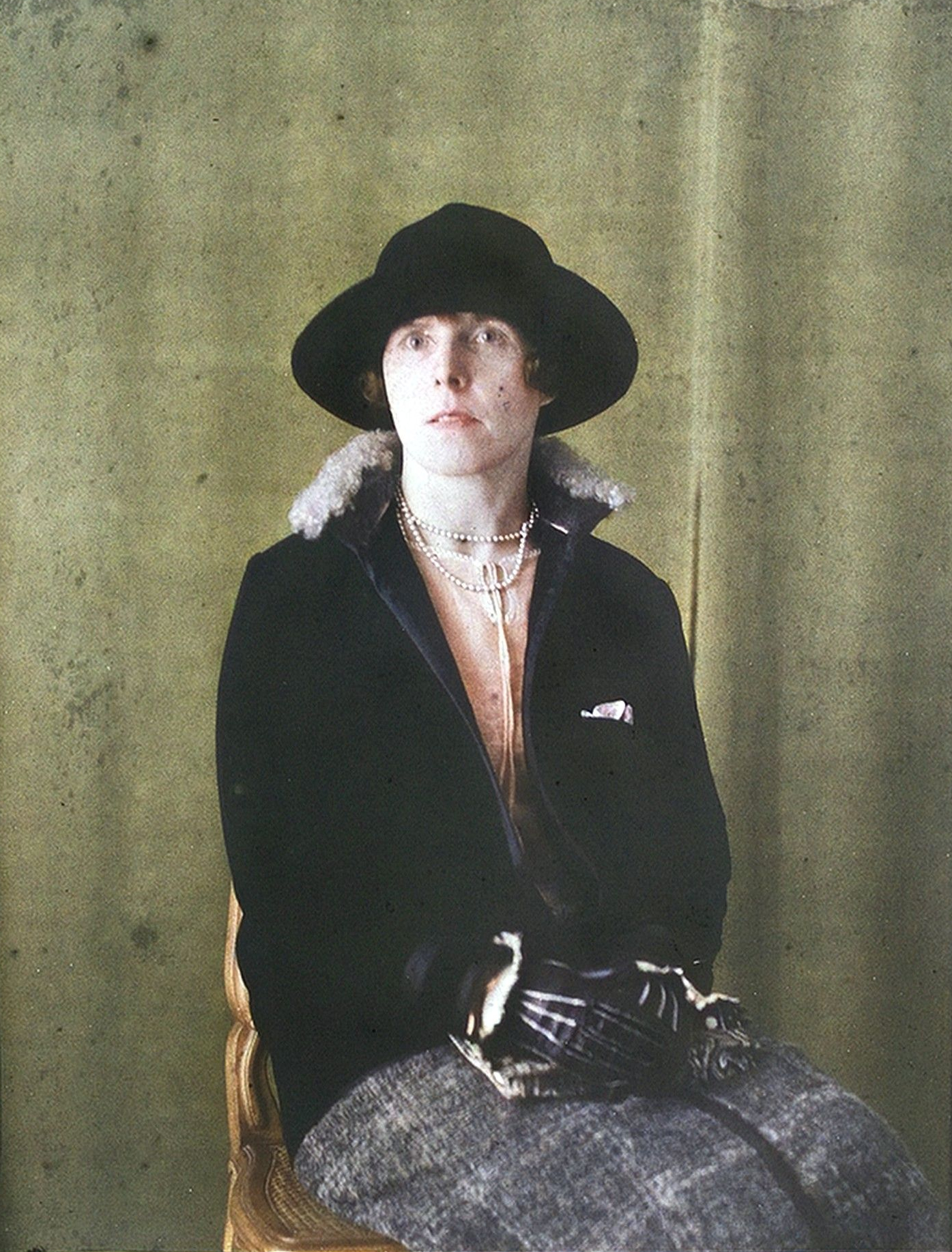
De Haas-Lorentz in 1927.

Geertruida Luberta de Haas-Lorentz (née Lorentz; 20 November 1885 – 1973) was a Dutch theoretical physicist and a professor at the Technical University of Delft. She was the first to theoretically study thermal fluctuations in electric circuits, treating electrons as Brownian particles. Consequently, she is considered one of the pioneers of electrical noise theory. She was the daughter and doctoral student of Hendrik Lorentz. She went by the name Berta, or Ber.

== Biography ==
Geertruida Luberta Lorentz was born on 20 October 1885 in Leiden, Netherlands, the eldest child of physicist and Nobel laureate Hendrik Lorentz and Aletta Lorentz-Kaiser. Her siblings were: Johanna Wilhelmina (born 1889), Gerrit (born 1893, died 1894), and Rudolf (born 1895). At the time of her birth, her father was Professor of Theoretical Physics at the Leiden University. Her mother took care of the children and household, did charity work, and was heavily involved with the local women's suffrage movement.

On 22 December 1910, Lorentz married Wander de Haas (who would become Professor of Experimental Physics at Leiden University), with whom she had two sons and two daughters. Some of their children changed their last name to "Lorentz de Haas."

De Haas-Lorentz studied physics at Leiden University, with her father as her doctoral advisor. In 1912, she received her Ph.D. with a thesis titled Over de theorie van de Brown'sche beweging en daarmede verwante verschijnselen (On the theory of Brownian motion and related phenomena).

After defending her doctoral thesis, de Haas-Lorentz taught physics at the Technical University of Delft and translated some of her father's works into German. She also wrote a biography of her father.

De Haas-Lorentz died on 2 January 1973 in Leiden at the age of 87.

== Research ==
De Haas-Lorentz was one the first to apply Albert Einstein's theory of Brownian motion to other domains. During her thesis work, she was the first to carry out a theoretical analysis of thermal fluctuation of electrons in electrical circuits, predating the experimental discovery of the Johnson–Nyquist noise. She considered that a circuit with resistance R and inductance L should store an energy E = LI^{2}/2, where I is the current. If there was a fluctuating thermal current, by the equipartition theorem the energy would be related to the thermal energy kT where k is the Boltzmann constant and T is the temperature. De Haas-Lorentz obtained,

$$\sqrt{\langle I^2\rangle}=\sqrt{ \frac{2 k T}{ L }}$$,

where the angle brackets denote the thermal average.

She was also the first to propose thermal fluctuations limit the detection of electromagnetic radiation.

In collaboration with her husband, the De Haas couple showed that experiments carried by James Clerk Maxwell failed to prove the hypothesis of André-Marie Ampère, that magnetism in matter is caused by microscopic current loops.

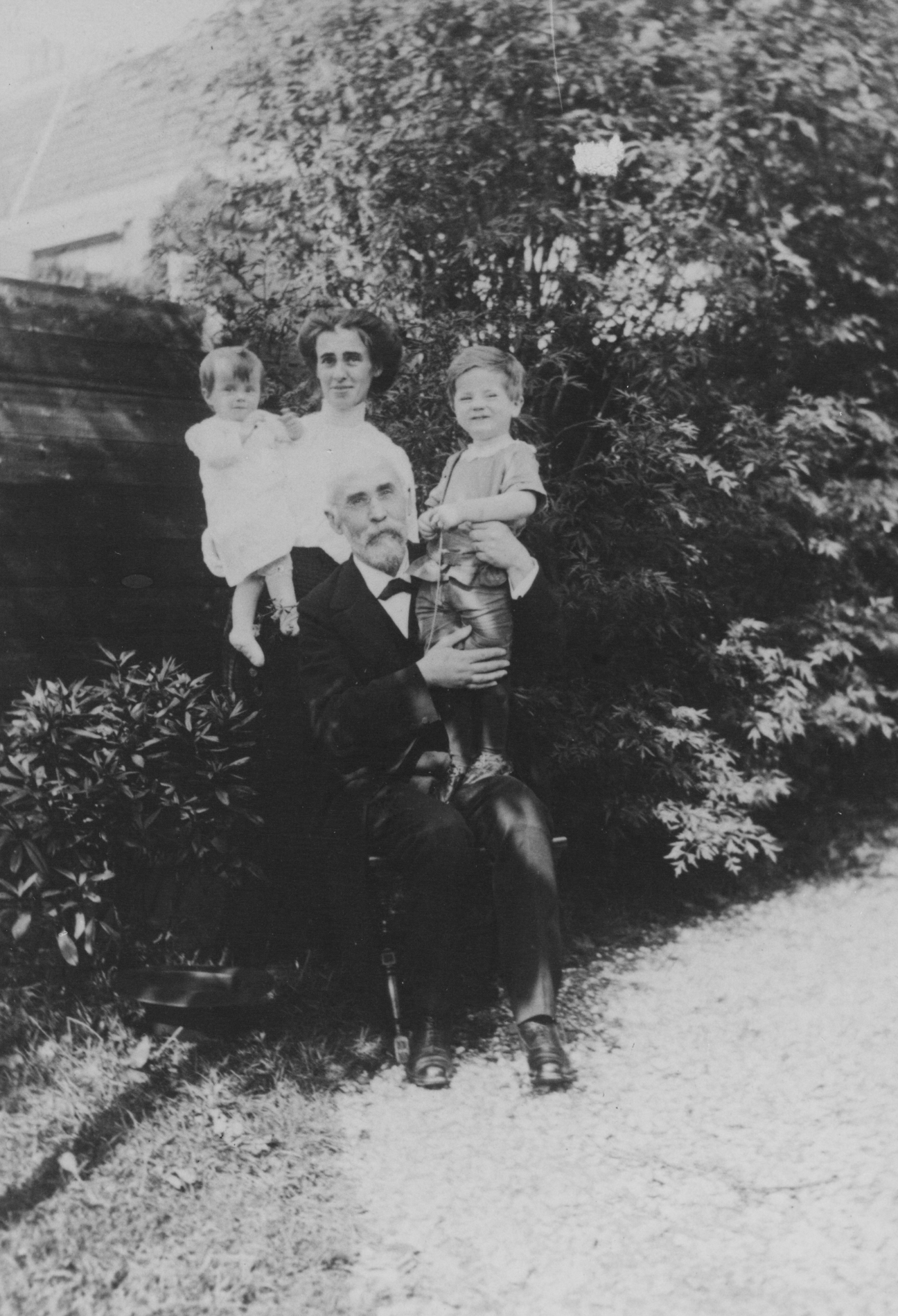
Geertruida de Haas-Lorentz with father Hendrik Lorentz seated and two small children (unknown)

She also predicted various effects in superconductivity. In 1925, she proposed that these materials would display superdiamagnetism, ten years before the discovery of the Meissner effect. However most of this work was ignored by the scientific community. She also predicted the London penetration depth, before the development of the London equations in 1935.

== Selected works ==
- De Haas-Lorentz, Geertruida (1912). Over de theorie van de Brown'sche beweging en daarmede verwante verschijnselen [On the theory of Brownian motion and related phenomena] (PDF) (Doctoral dissertation thesis) (in Dutch). University of Leiden.
- De Haas-Lorentz, Geertruida (1913). Die Brownsche Bewegung und einige verwandte erscheinungen [Brownian motion and some related phenomena] (in German). Braunschweig: F. Vieweg. OCLC 5160522.
- De Haas-Lorentz, Geertruida; Lorentz, H. A. (1919). Theorie der quanta [Theory of quanta]. OCLC 81861598.
- Lessen over theoretische natuurkunde : aan de Rijks-Universiteit te Leiden [Lessons on theoretical physics at Leiden State University]. Vol. 1–5. 1919–1926. OCLC 805502380. – contributing author
- Lorentz, H. A.; Bruins, Eva Dina; Reudler, Johanna; De Haas-Lorentz, Geertruida Luberta (1928). Kinetische Probleme [Kinetic Problems] (in German). Leipzig: Akademische Verlagsgesellschaft. OCLC 28005510.
- De Haas-Lorentz, Geertruida Luberta (1946). De beide hoofdwetten der thermodynamica en hare voornaamste toepassingen [The two main laws of thermodynamics and their main applications] (in Dutch). 's-Gravenhage: M. Nijhoff. OCLC 361410098.
- De Haas-Lorentz, Geertruida Luberta, ed. (1957). H. A. Lorentz: impression of his life and work. Amsterdam: North-Holland Pub. Co. OCLC 317334917.
