= Jean-Jacques Ampère =

French philologist (1800–1864)

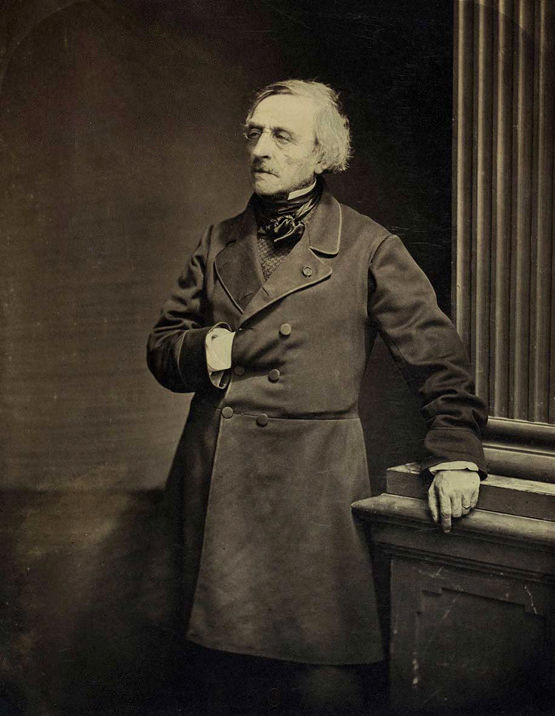
- Jean-Jacques Ampère

Signature
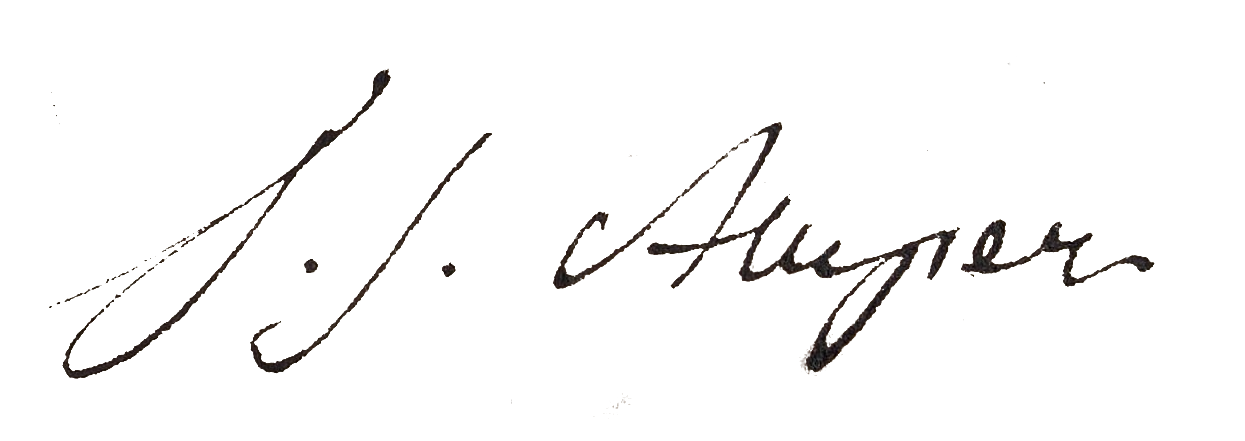

Jean-Jacques Ampère (12 August 1800 – 27 March 1864) was a French philologist and man of letters.

Born in Lyon, he was the only son of the physicist André-Marie Ampère (1775–1836). Jean-Jacques' mother died while he was an infant. (But André-Marie Ampère had a daughter – Albine (1807–1842) – with his second wife.) On his tomb at the cemetery of Montmartre, Paris, he is named Jean-Jacques Antoine Ampère. His father's father was also named Jean-Jacques Ampère (executed in Lyon, 1793).

He studied the folk songs and popular poetry of the Scandinavian countries in an extended tour in northern Europe. Returning to France in 1830, he delivered a series of lectures on Scandinavian and early German poetry at the Athenaeum in Marseille. The first of these was printed as De l'Histoire de la poésie (1830), and was practically the first introduction of the French public to the Scandinavian and German epics.

Moving to Paris, he taught at the Sorbonne, and became professor of the history of French literature at the Collège de France. A journey in northern Africa (1841) was followed by a tour in Greece and Italy, in company with Prosper Mérimée, Jean de Witte and Charles Lenormant. This bore fruit in his Voyage dantesque (printed in his Grèce, Rome et Dante, 1848), which did much to popularize the study of Dante in France.

In 1848 he became a member of the Académie française, and in 1851 he visited America. From this time he was occupied with his chief work, L'Histoire romaine à Rome (4 vols., 1861–1864), until his death at Pau.

The Correspondence et souvenirs (2 vols.) of A-M and J-J Ampère (1805–1854) was published in 1875. Notices of J-J Ampère are to be found in Sainte-Beuve's Portraits littéraires, vol. iv., and Nouveaux Lundis, vol. xiii.; in P Mérimée's Portraits historiques et littéraires (2nd ed., 1875); and in Alexis de Tocqueville's Recollections (1893).

The Ampère Museum, close to Lyon, France, includes some documents presenting the life and works of Jean-Jacques Ampère.
