= Barnett effect =

Magnetization of an uncharged body when spun on its axis

The Barnett effect is the magnetization of an uncharged body when spun on its axis. It was discovered by American physicist Samuel Barnett in 1915.

An uncharged object rotating with angular velocity ω tends to spontaneously magnetize, with a magnetization given by

$$M = \chi \omega / \gamma,$$

where γ is the gyromagnetic ratio for the material, χ is the magnetic susceptibility.

The magnetization occurs parallel to the axis of spin. Barnett was motivated by a prediction by Owen Richardson in 1908, later named the Einstein–de Haas effect, that magnetizing a ferromagnet can induce a mechanical rotation. He instead looked for the inverse effect, that is, that spinning a ferromagnet could change its magnetization. He established the effect with a long series of experiments between 1908 and 1915.

== See also ==
- London moment
