= Ampère Museum =

Science museum in Lyon, France

Musée Ampère
- Established: 1 July 1930
- Location: Poleymieux-au-Mont-d'Or, Lyon Metropolis, Auvergne-Rhône-Alpes, France Ampère Museum (France)
- Coordinates: 45.854198°N 4.799212°W
- Collections: History of electricity
- Website: amperemusee.fr

The Ampère Museum is a science museum near Lyon, France. It is specialized on the history of electricity and its applications and is dedicated to André-Marie Ampère (1775–1836). The museum is located in Poleymieux-au-Mont-d'Or at approximately 15 km (9.3 mi) from Lyon by road and is housed in the house where André-Marie Ampère spent part of his youth. It was awarded the "Maisons des Illustres" (Illustrious house) label in 2013.

The museum includes a garden with panoramic views of the surrounding countryside, as well as a 17th-century family chapel.

The Ampère Museum has received the EPS historical site label (2021) awarded by the European Physical Society and the IEEE Historic Milestone label (2023) awarded by the IEEE.

== History ==
In 1928, Hernand and Sosthenes Behn, American businessmen, of French origin by their mother, co-founders of the multinational company ITT, which at that time was developing its activities in France, on the advice of Paul Janet and as patrons of the arts, acquired the former Ampère property which had just been put up for sale. They donated it to the "Société française des électriciens", which two years later entrusted it to the Society of Friends of André-Marie Ampère. The museum was inaugurated on 1 July 1931.

== Exhibitions ==
The museum consists of two espaces with a total of eleven exhibition rooms. Audioguides in French and English are available to visitors.

The first space focuses on the history of electricity and includes numerous interactive exhibits as well as original material related to André-Marie Ampère.

The second space is devoted to the applications of electricity, including lighting, telegraphy, medical applications, and many others. Renewable energy production, including wind turbines and photovoltaic systems, is presented both inside the museum and in a dedicated outdoor garden.

The museum houses the original apparatus of the Einstein–de Haas experiment, the only fundamental research experiment conceived, carried out, and published by Albert Einstein. Conducted in 1915 by Einstein and Wander Johannes de Haas, the experiment provided experimental evidence for Ampère's theory of molecular currents, establishing the electron-based origin of magnetism.

Models reproducing the fundamental experiments in electromagnetism carried out by Ampère and certain physicists of his time as Hans Christian Ørsted, Michael Faraday and many others can be put into operation. They come with explanations, additional information and games.

In one of the rooms the visitor finds portraits, books and manuscripts associated with the Ampère family: André-Marie Ampère (1775–1836) as well as his father Jean-Jacques (1733–1793) and his son Jean-Jacques Ampère (1800–1864).

The museum also has a separate room, "L'espace Ampère", with seating for 50 people, which can accommodate colloquiums or meetings.

The museum shop offers a few books and souvenirs.

== Labeling and distinctions ==
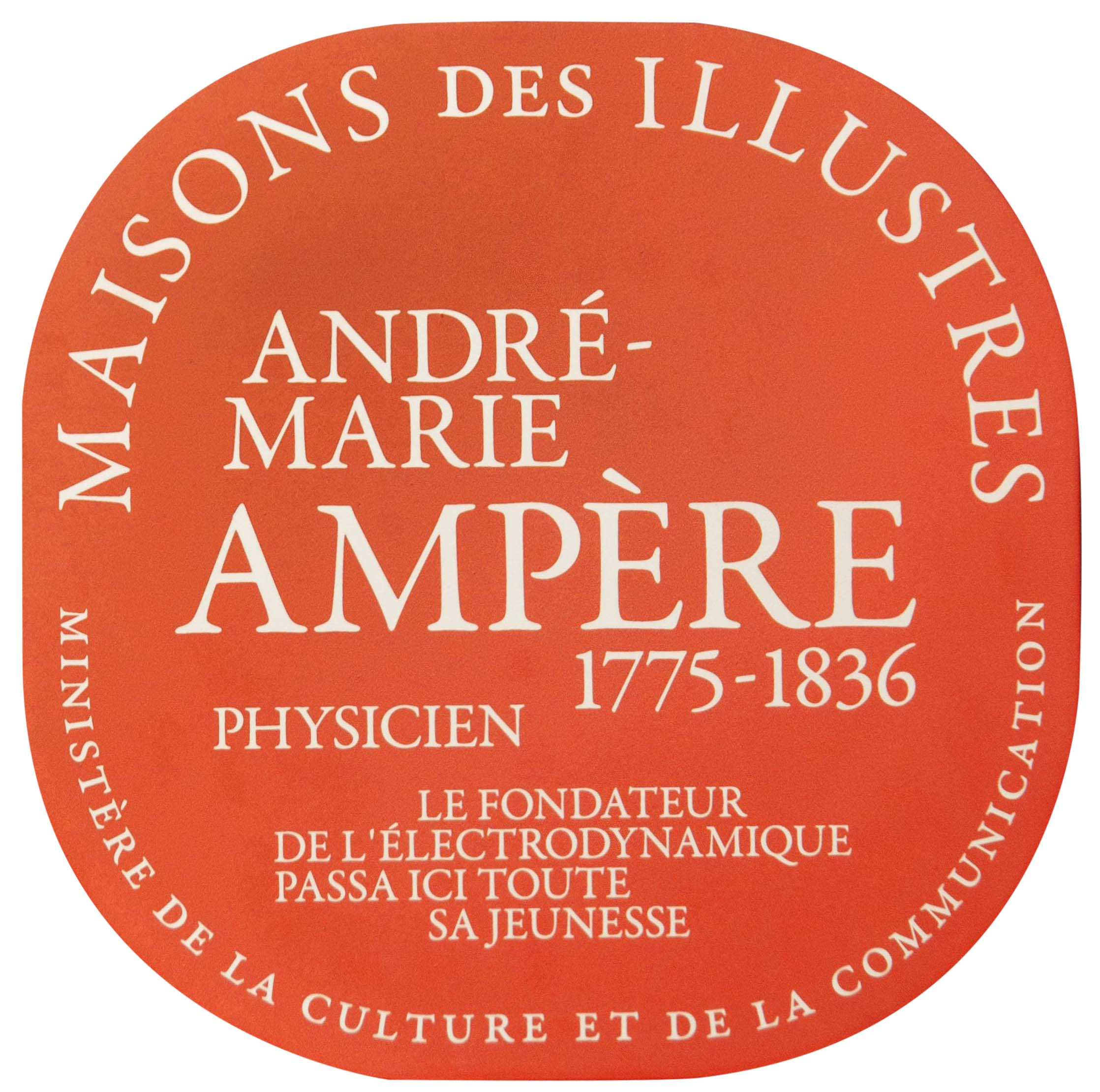
Plaque for "Maison des Illustres"

Since 2013, the Ampère Museum has been recognized as a "Maison des Illustres". This designation is bestowed by the French Ministry of Culture.

The Society of Friends of André-Marie Ampère, which manages the museum, was awarded the 2018 Medal of Honor by the Academy of Lyon on 18 December 2018.

Since 2021, the Ampère Museum has been labeled an "EPS Historic site," a recognition of being a "historical site of European physics," awarded by the European Physical Society.

In 2023, the Ampère Museum was granted the IEEE Historic Milestone label. Two commemorative plaques marking the bicentenary of André-Marie Ampère's discoveries in the fields of electricity and magnetism were unveiled at the Collège de France (Paris) and at the Ampère Museum. The IEEE is one of the largest professional organizations in the world.

== Science school ==
The museum offers one-day or half-day visits to contribute to pedagogical projects, from elementary school to high schools and even beyond.
