= Samuel Jackson Barnett =

American physicist

Samuel Jackson Barnett (December 14, 1873 – May 22, 1956) was an American physicist. He was a professor at the University of California, Los Angeles.

Barnett was born in Woodson County, Kansas, the son of a minister. In 1894, he received a B.A. in physics from the University of Denver and received his Ph.D. from Cornell University in 1898. From 1898 to 1918 he taught at several universities: Colorado College, Stanford University, Tulane University, and Ohio State University. In 1903 he published his book Elements of Electromagnetic Theory, which he dedicated to his friend Professor Francis H. Smith at the University of Virginia.

From 1918 to 1926 he worked at the Carnegie Institution for Science in Washington, DC. In 1926 he was a professor at the University of California at Los Angeles.

Barnett worked mainly on electromagnetism, and discovered the Barnett effect. His wife, Mrs. Lelia Jefferson Harvie Barnett, was a scientific co-collaborator, and together they worked in a magnetic metal-free lab at the California Institute of Technology from 1924 to 1953.

He was elected a Fellow of the American Academy of Arts and Sciences in 1921.

Barnett died in Pasadena, California, about a month after the death of his wife, Lelia Jefferson Harvie Barnett. They had no children, but their adopted daughter, Ann, also died shortly after Barnett's retirement from the university.

== Works ==
- Elements of electro-magnetic theory, 1903
- Theories of magnetism, 1923
- Le Magnetisme, 1940
