= Maisons des Illustres =

Logo of Maisons des Illustres

Maisons des Illustres is a mark of quality (French: label de qualité) of buildings in France, indicating places where the purpose is to preserve the memory of people distinguished in the political, social and cultural history of France.

It was created by Frédéric Mitterrand, the Minister of Culture, in September 2011, to make known to the public the places that keep collections related to personalities, and give them a higher profile. He said that they should be "more than reliquaries, but real living homes". Initially, 111 buildings received the award.

It is awarded by the Ministry of Culture; it is valid for five years and is renewable. In 2018, there were 235 buildings with the award, eight being awarded in that year.

To be eligible for consideration, a building must be open to the public at least 40 days in the year, with or without appointment; its purpose must not be basically commercial; it must have been the residence of the famous person and have retained a memory of the person.
