= Poleymieux-au-Mont-d'Or =

- Commune
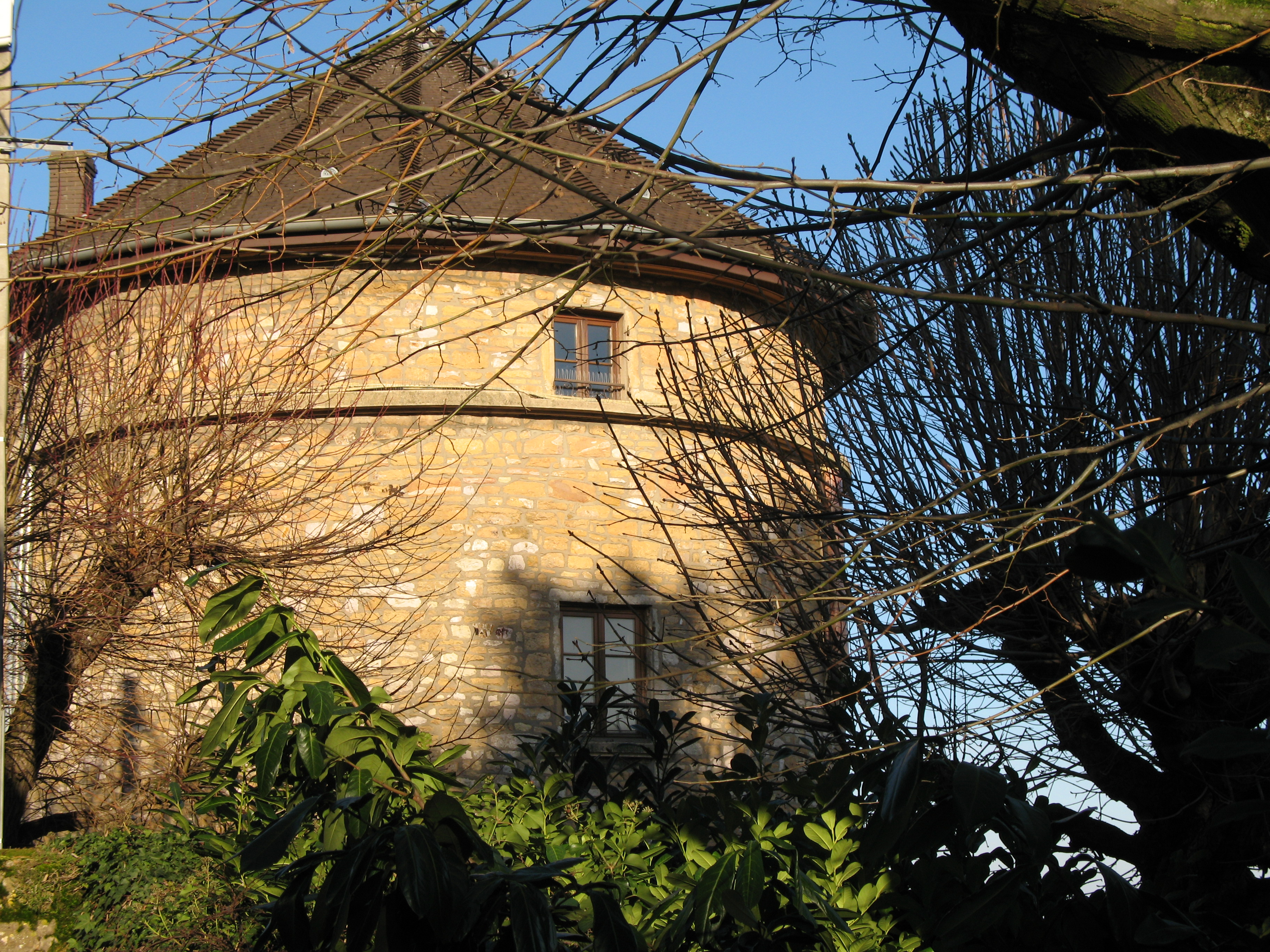
- The Tower of Rissler, in Poleymieux-au-Mont-d'Or
- Location of Poleymieux-au-Mont-d'Or
- Location within France Location within Auvergne-Rhône-Alpes
- Coordinates: 45°51′25″N 4°48′03″E
- Country: France
- Region: Auvergne-Rhône-Alpes
- Metropolis: Lyon Metropolis
- Arrondissement: Lyon

Government
  - Mayor (2020–2026): Corinne Cardona
- Area^{1}: 6.21 km^{2} (2.40 sq mi)
- Elevation: 355 m (1,165 ft)
- Highest elevation: 605 m (1,985 ft)
- Lowest elevation: 276 m (906 ft)
- Population (2023): 1,412
  - Density: 227/km^{2} (589/sq mi)
- Demonym: Poleymoriot
- Time zone: UTC+01:00 (CET)
  - Summer (DST): UTC+02:00 (CEST)
- INSEE/Postal code: 69153 /69250
- Website: www.poleymieux.fr
- ^{1} French Land Register data, which excludes lakes, ponds, glaciers > 1 km^{2} (0.386 sq mi or 247 acres) and river estuaries.

Poleymieux-au-Mont-d'Or (French pronunciation: [pɔlemjø o mɔ̃ dɔʁ]) is a commune in the Metropolis of Lyon, located in the administrative region of Auvergne-Rhône-Alpes, eastern France. The Ampère Museum, in the youth house of André-Marie Ampère is its main cultural attraction. Created in 1931, it is the first museum worldwide devoted to the history of electricity.

== See also ==
- Communes of the Metropolis of Lyon
