= Hendrik Lorentz =

Dutch physicist (1853–1928)

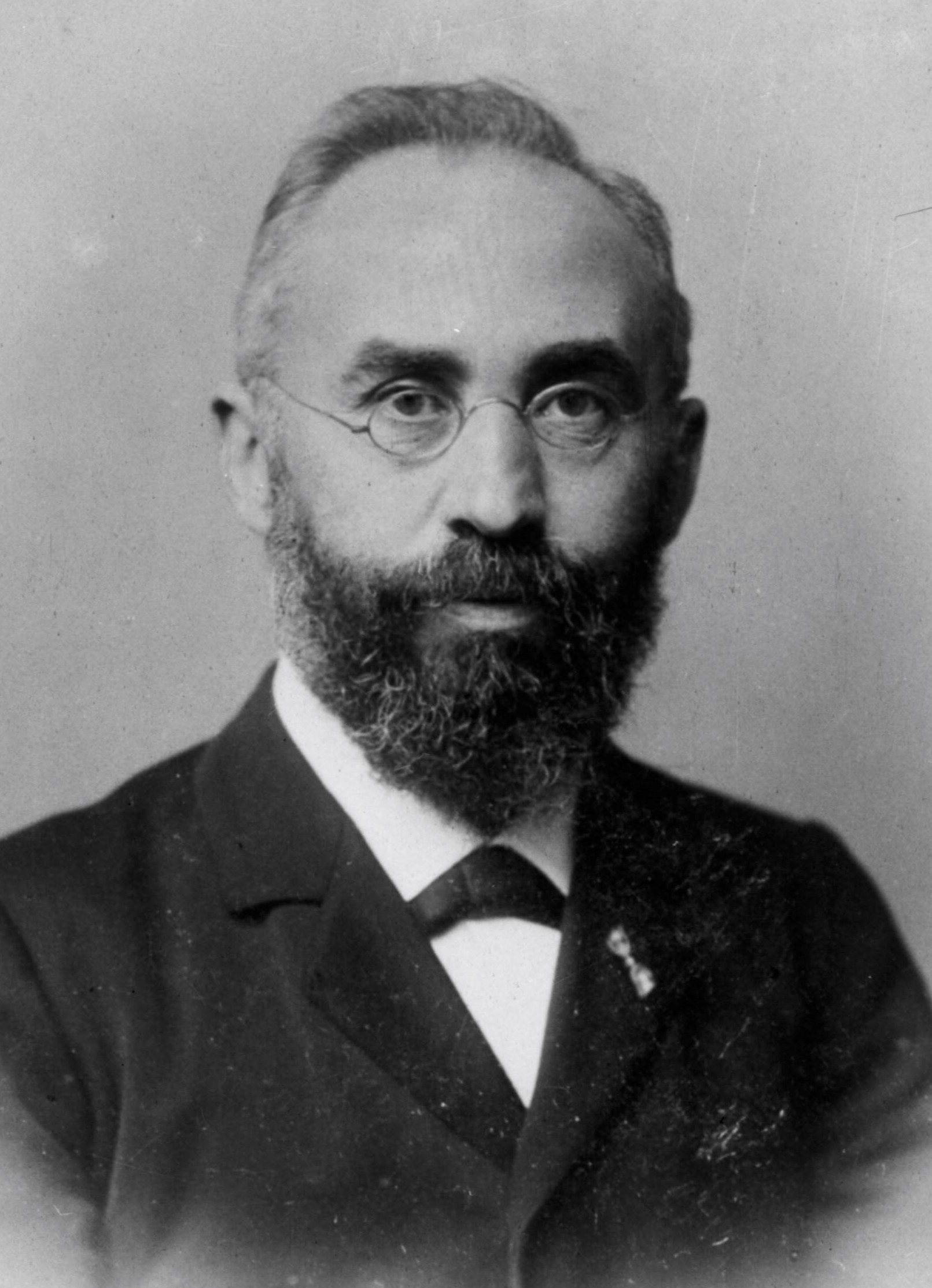
- Lorentz in 1902
- Born: Hendrik Antoon Lorentz; 18 July 1853; Arnhem, Netherlands
- Died: 4 February 1928 (aged 74); Haarlem, Netherlands
- Education: Leiden University: Candidate, Mathematics and Physics; Doctor, Physics
- Known for: Lorentz covariance; Lorentz ether theory; Lorentz factor; Lorentz force; Lorentz group; Lorentz oscillator model; Lorentz transformation; Lorentz–FitzGerald contraction; Lorentz–Lorenz equation; Abraham–Lorentz force; Drude–Lorentz model; Tauc–Lorentz model; Heaviside–Lorentz units
- Spouse: Aletta Catharina Kaiser (m. 1881)
- Children: 3, including Geertruida
- Relatives: Wander Johannes de Haas (son-in-law)
- Awards: Nobel Prize in Physics (1902); Rumford Medal (1908); Franklin Medal (1917); Copley Medal (1918)
- Scientific career
- Fields: Physics
- Workplaces: Leiden University; Teylers Museum
- Thesis: Over de theorie der terugkaatsing en breking van het licht (1875)
- Doctoral advisor: Pieter Rijke
- Doctoral students: Geertruida de Haas-Lorentz; Johannes Droste; Adriaan Fokker; Hendrika van Leeuwen; Leonard Ornstein

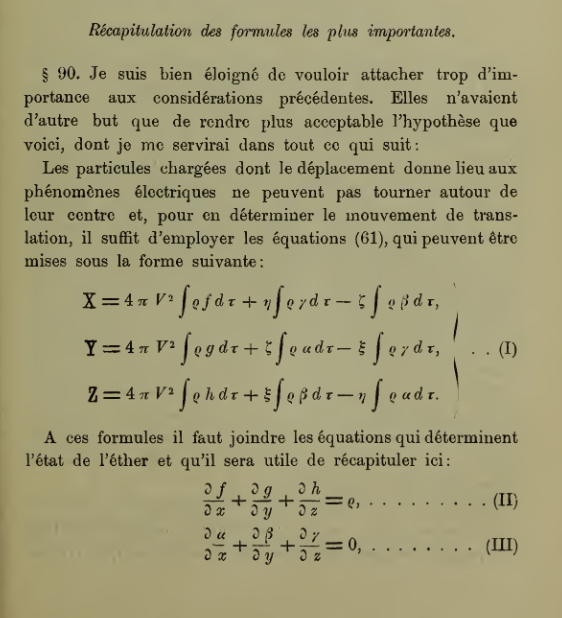
Lorentz' theory of electrons. Formulas for the Lorentz force (I) and the Maxwell equations for the divergence of the electrical field E (II) and the magnetic field B (III), La théorie electromagnétique de Maxwell et son application aux corps mouvants, 1892, p. 451. V is the velocity of light.

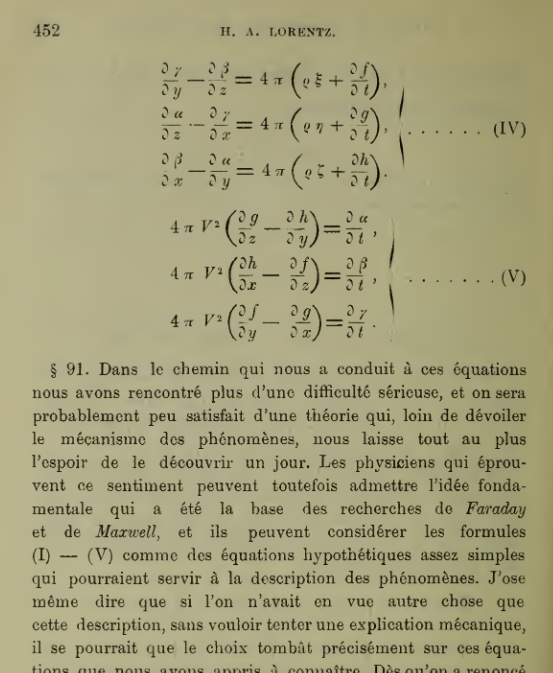
Lorentz' theory of electrons. Formulas for the curl of the magnetic field (IV) and the electrical field E (V), La théorie electromagnétique de Maxwell et son application aux corps mouvants, 1892, p. 452

Hendrik Antoon Lorentz (Note: /ˈlɔːrənts, ˈloʊr-, ˈloʊrɛnts/ LAWR-uhnts, LOHR-, LOH-rents; Dutch: [ˈɦɛndrɪk ɑnˈtoːn ˈloːrɛnts]) (18 July 1853 – 4 February 1928) was a Dutch theoretical physicist who shared the 1902 Nobel Prize in Physics with Pieter Zeeman for their discovery and theoretical explanation of the Zeeman effect. He derived the Lorentz transformation of the special theory of relativity, as well as the Lorentz force, which describes the force acting on a charged particle in an electromagnetic field. He was also responsible for the Lorentz oscillator model, a classical model used to describe the anomalous dispersion observed in dielectric materials when the driving frequency of the electric field was near the resonant frequency of the material, resulting in abnormal refractive indices.

Lorentz received many other honors and distinctions, including a term as Chairman of the International Committee on Intellectual Cooperation, the forerunner of UNESCO, from 1925 until his death in 1928.

== Early life and education ==
Hendrik Antoon Lorentz was born on 18 July 1853 in Arnhem, Gelderland, Netherlands, the son of Geertruida (née van Ginkel) and Gerrit Frederik Lorentz. His mother died when he was four-years-old, and in 1862 his father married Luberta Hupkes. Despite being raised as a Protestant, he was a freethinker in religious matters and regularly attended Catholic mass at his local French church.

From 1866 to 1869, Lorentz attended the Hogere Burgerschool in Arnhem, a new type of public high school recently established by Johan Thorbecke. His results in school were exemplary; not only did he excel in the physical sciences and mathematics, but also in English, French, and German. In 1870, he passed the exams in classical languages, which were then required for admission to university.

In 1870, Lorentz entered Leiden University, where he graduated in 1871 with a candidate degree in Mathematics and Physics. While teaching night classes in Arnhem, Lorentz pursued a doctorate at Leiden, writing his thesis on the reflection and refraction of light, in which he refined the electromagnetic theory of James Clerk Maxwell.

== Career ==
In 1878, Lorentz was appointed to the newly established Chair of Theoretical Physics at Leiden University; the position had initially been offered to Johannes van der Waals, but he had just accepted a professorship at the University of Amsterdam. On 25 January 1878, he delivered his inaugural lecture titled De moleculaire theoriën in de natuurkunde (The molecular theories in physics).

During his first 20 years at Leiden, Lorentz was primarily interested in the electromagnetic theory of electricity, magnetism, and light. After that, he extended his research to a much wider area while still focusing on theoretical physics. He made significant contributions to fields ranging from hydrodynamics to general relativity. His most important contributions were in the area of electromagnetism, the electron theory, and relativity.

In 1910, Lorentz decided to reorganize his career; his teaching and management duties at Leiden University were taking up too much of his time, leaving him little time for research. He initially asked Albert Einstein to succeed him as Professor of Theoretical Physics at Leiden. However, Einstein did not accept, because he had just taken up a position at ETH Zurich and the prospect of having to fill Lorentz's shoes made him shiver. He ultimately chose Paul Ehrenfest as his successor.

In 1912, Lorentz resigned from his chair at Leiden University to become Curator of the Physical Cabinet at Teylers Museum in Haarlem. He also became Secretary of the Koninklijke Hollandsche Maatschappij der Wetenschappen. Lorentz continued to teach at Leiden as Extraordinary Professor, delivering his famous "Monday morning lectures" on new developments in theoretical physics.

== Research ==
=== Electrodynamics and relativity ===
In 1892 and 1895, Lorentz worked on describing electromagnetic phenomena (the propagation of light) in reference frames that move relative to the postulated luminiferous aether. He discovered that the transition from one to another reference frame could be simplified by using a new time variable that he called local time and which depended on universal time and the location under consideration. Although he did not give a detailed interpretation of the physical significance of local time, with it, he could explain the aberration of light and the result of the Fizeau experiment. In 1900 and 1904, Henri Poincaré called local time Lorentz's "most ingenious idea" and illustrated it by showing that clocks in moving frames are synchronized by exchanging light signals that are assumed to travel at the same speed against and with the motion of the frame (see Einstein synchronisation and Relativity of simultaneity). In 1892, with the attempt to explain the Michelson–Morley experiment, he also proposed that moving bodies contract in the direction of motion.

In 1899 and again in 1904, Lorentz added time dilation to his transformations and published what Poincaré in 1905 named Lorentz transformations.

It was apparently unknown to Lorentz that Joseph Larmor had used identical transformations to describe orbiting electrons in 1897. Larmor's and Lorentz's equations look somewhat dissimilar, but they are algebraically equivalent to those presented by Poincaré and Einstein in 1905. Lorentz's 1904 paper includes the covariant formulation of electrodynamics, in which electrodynamic phenomena in different reference frames are described by identical equations with well defined transformation properties. The paper clearly recognizes the significance of this formulation, namely that the outcomes of electrodynamic experiments do not depend on the relative motion of the reference frame. The 1904 paper includes a detailed discussion of the increase of the inertial mass of rapidly moving objects in a useless attempt to make momentum look exactly like Newtonian momentum; it was also an attempt to explain the length contraction as the accumulation of "stuff" onto mass making it slow and contract.

=== Zeeman effect ===
Lorentz theorized that atoms consist of charged particles, and suggested that the oscillations of these charged particles were the source of light. His colleague and former student, Pieter Zeeman, discovered the Zeeman effect in 1896, and Lorentz supplied its theoretical interpretation. Their joint work earned them the Nobel Prize in Physics in 1902.

=== Special relativity ===
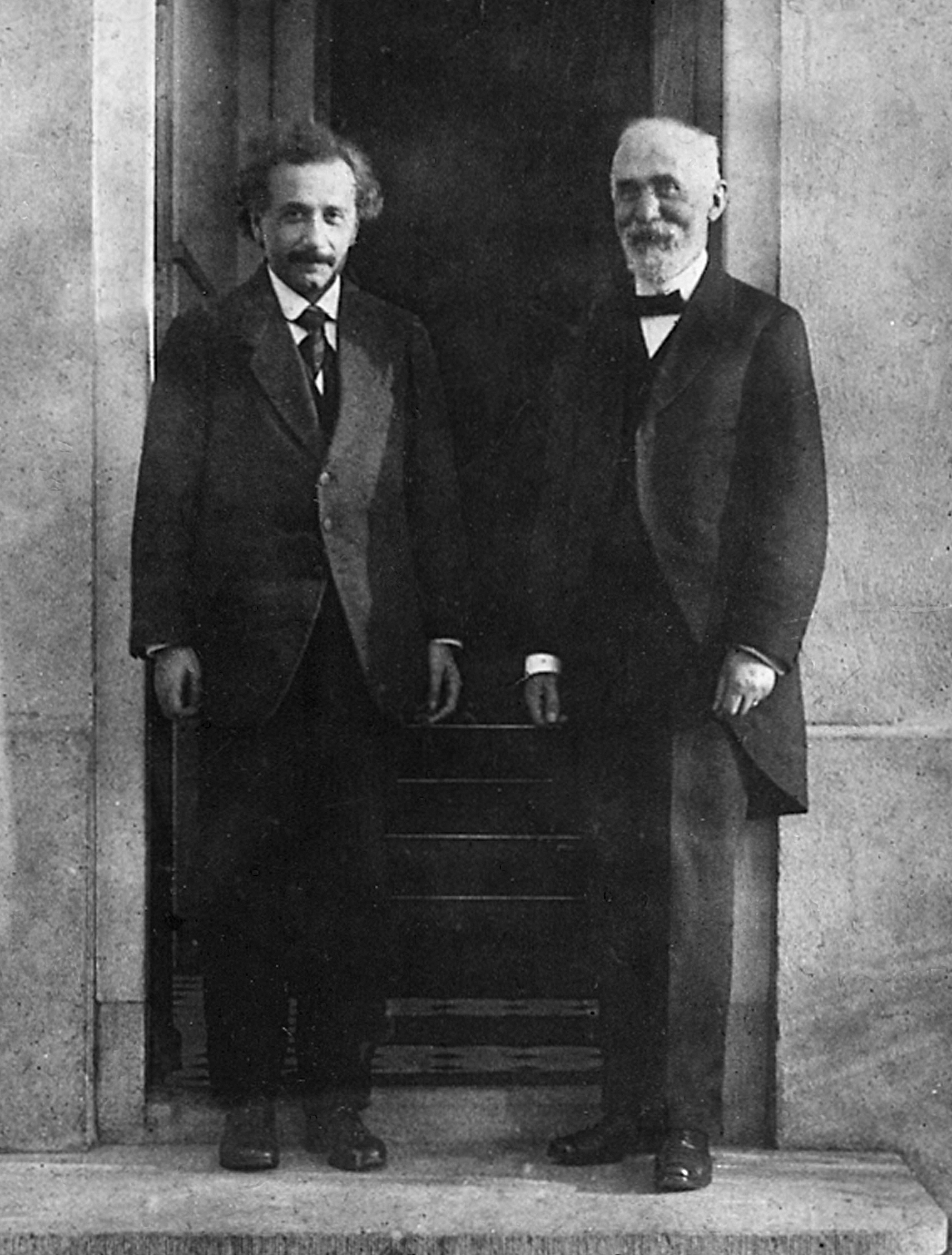
Albert Einstein and Hendrik Lorentz, photographed by Paul Ehrenfest in front of his home in Leiden in 1921.

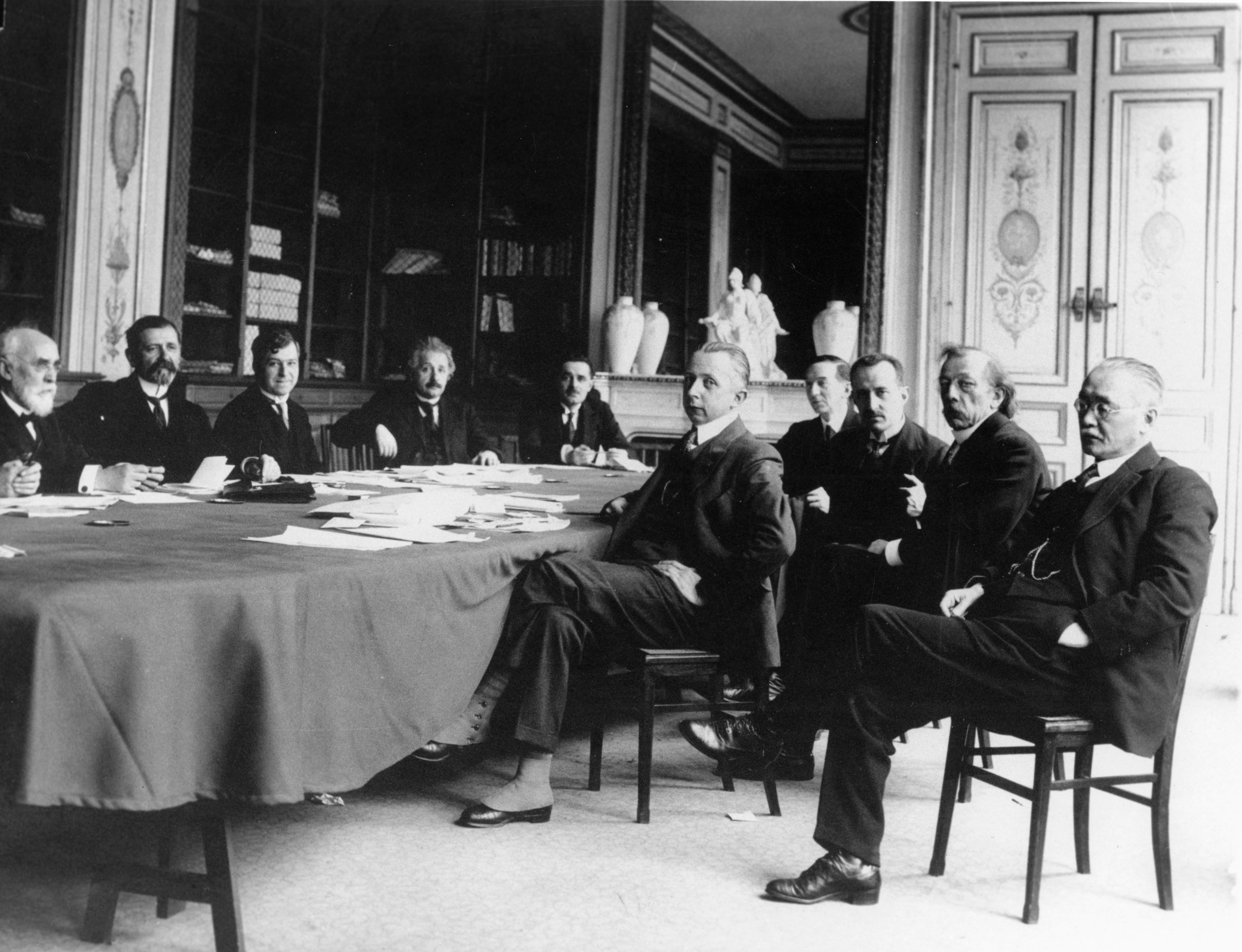
Lorentz (left) at the International Committee on Intellectual Cooperation of the League of Nations, 1924.

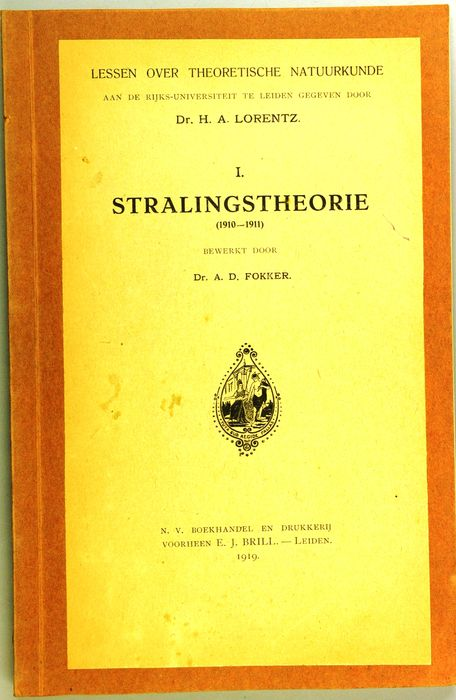
His published university lectures in theoretical physics. Part 1. Stralingstheorie (1910–1911, Radiation theory) in Dutch, edited by his student A. D. Fokker, 1919.

In 1905, Einstein would use many of the concepts, mathematical tools and results Lorentz discussed to write his paper titled Zur Elektrodynamik bewegter Körper (On the electrodynamics of moving bodies), known today as the special theory of relativity. Einstein's unique perspective on the topic was not widely understood initially, causing some physicists to confusingly refer to the theory as the Lorentz–Einstein theory.

In 1910, Lorentz's 1906 lectures at Columbia University, were published under the title The Theory of Electrons. Lorentz covered his entire theory of the electron, including his work and that of Einstein on relativity. In this work he spoke affirmatively of Einstein's theory:

It will be clear by what has been said that the impressions received by the two observers A0 and A would be alike in all respects. It would be impossible to decide which of them moves or stands still with respect to the ether, and there would be no reason for preferring the times and lengths measured by the one to those determined by the other, nor for saying that either of them is in possession of the "true" times or the "true" lengths. This is a point which Einstein has laid particular stress on, in a theory in which he starts from what he calls the principle of relativity, I cannot speak here of the many highly interesting applications which Einstein has made of this principle. His results concerning electromagnetic and optical phenomena agree in the main with those which we have obtained in the preceding pages, the chief difference being that Einstein simply postulates what we have deduced, with some difficulty and not altogether satisfactorily, from the fundamental equations of the electromagnetic field. By doing so, he may certainly take credit for making us see in the negative result of experiments like those of Michelson, Rayleigh and Brace, not a fortuitous compensation of opposing effects, but the manifestation of a general and fundamental principle. It would be unjust not to add that, besides the fascinating boldness of its starting point, Einstein's theory has another marked advantage over mine. Whereas I have not been able to obtain for the equations referred to moving axes exactly the same form as for those which apply to a stationary system, Einstein has accomplished this by means of a system of new variables slightly different from those which I have introduced.

Though Lorentz still maintained that there is an (undetectable) aether in which resting clocks indicate the "true time":

1909: Yet, I think, something may also be claimed in favour of the form in which I have presented the theory. I cannot but regard the ether, which can be the seat of an electromagnetic field with its energy and its vibrations, as endowed with a certain degree of substantiality, however different it may be from all ordinary matter.
1910: Provided that there is an aether, then under all systems x, y, z, t, one is preferred by the fact, that the coordinate axes as well as the clocks are resting in the aether. If one connects with this the idea (which I would abandon only reluctantly) that space and time are completely different things, and that there is a "true time" (simultaneity thus would be independent of the location, in agreement with the circumstance that we can have the idea of infinitely great velocities), then it can be easily seen that this true time should be indicated by clocks at rest in the aether. However, if the relativity principle had general validity in nature, one wouldn't be in the position to determine, whether the reference system just used is the preferred one. Then one comes to the same results, as if one (following Einstein and Minkowski) deny the existence of the aether and of true time, and to see all reference systems as equally valid. Which of these two ways of thinking one is following, can surely be left to the individual.

Lorentz also gave credit to Poincaré's contributions to relativity.

Indeed, for some of the physical quantities which enter the formulas, I did not indicate the transformation which suits best. That was done by Poincaré and then by Mr. Einstein and Minkowski. I did not succeed in obtaining the exact invariance of the equations. Poincaré, on the contrary, obtained a perfect invariance of the equations of electrodynamics, and he formulated the "postulate of relativity", terms which he was the first to employ. Let us add that by correcting the imperfections of my work he never reproached me for them.

=== General relativity ===
Lorentz was one of few scientists who supported Einstein's search for general relativity from the beginning – he wrote several research papers and discussed with Einstein personally and by letter. For instance, he attempted to combine Einstein's formalism with Hamilton's principle (1915), and to reformulate it in a coordinate-free way (1916). Lorentz wrote in 1919:

The total eclipse of the sun of May 29, resulted in a striking confirmation of the new theory of the universal attractive power of gravitation developed by Albert Einstein, and thus reinforced the conviction that the defining of this theory is one of the most important steps ever taken in the domain of natural science.

=== Quantum mechanics ===
Lorentz gave a series of lectures in the fall of 1926 at Cornell University on the new quantum mechanics; in these he presented Erwin Schrödinger's wave mechanics.

== Civil work ==
After World War I, Lorentz was one of the driving forces behind the founding of the Wetenschappelijke Commissie van Advies en Onderzoek in het Belang van Volkswelvaart en Weerbaarheid, a committee which was to harness the scientific potential united in the Royal Netherlands Academy of Arts and Sciences (KNAW) for solving civil problems such as food shortage which had resulted from the war. Lorentz was appointed chair of the committee. However, despite the best efforts of many of the participants the committee would harvest little success. The only exception being that it ultimately resulted in the founding of TNO, the Netherlands Organisation for Applied Scientific Research.

Lorentz was also asked by the Dutch government to chair a committee to calculate some of the effects of the proposed Afsluitdijk (Enclosure Dam) flood control dam on water levels in the Waddenzee. Hydraulic engineering was mainly an empirical science at that time, but the disturbance of the tidal flow caused by the Afsluitdijk was so unprecedented that the empirical rules could not be trusted. Originally, Lorentz was only supposed to have a coordinating role in the committee, but it quickly became apparent that Lorentz was the only physicist to have any fundamental traction on the problem. In the period 1918 till 1926, Lorentz invested a large portion of his time in the problem. Lorentz proposed to start from the basic hydrodynamic equations of motion and solve the problem numerically. This was feasible for a "human computer", because of the quasi-one-dimensional nature of the water flow in the Waddenzee. The Afsluitdijk was completed in 1932, and the predictions of Lorentz and his committee turned out to be remarkably accurate. One of the two sets of locks in the Afsluitdijk was named after him.

== Family ==
In 1881, Lorentz married Aletta Catharina Kaiser, with whom he had two daughters and one son. The eldest daughter, Geertruida, was a physicist and a doctoral student of her father. She married Wander de Haas, who was the Director of the Kamerlingh Onnes Laboratory at Leiden University.

== Death and funeral ==
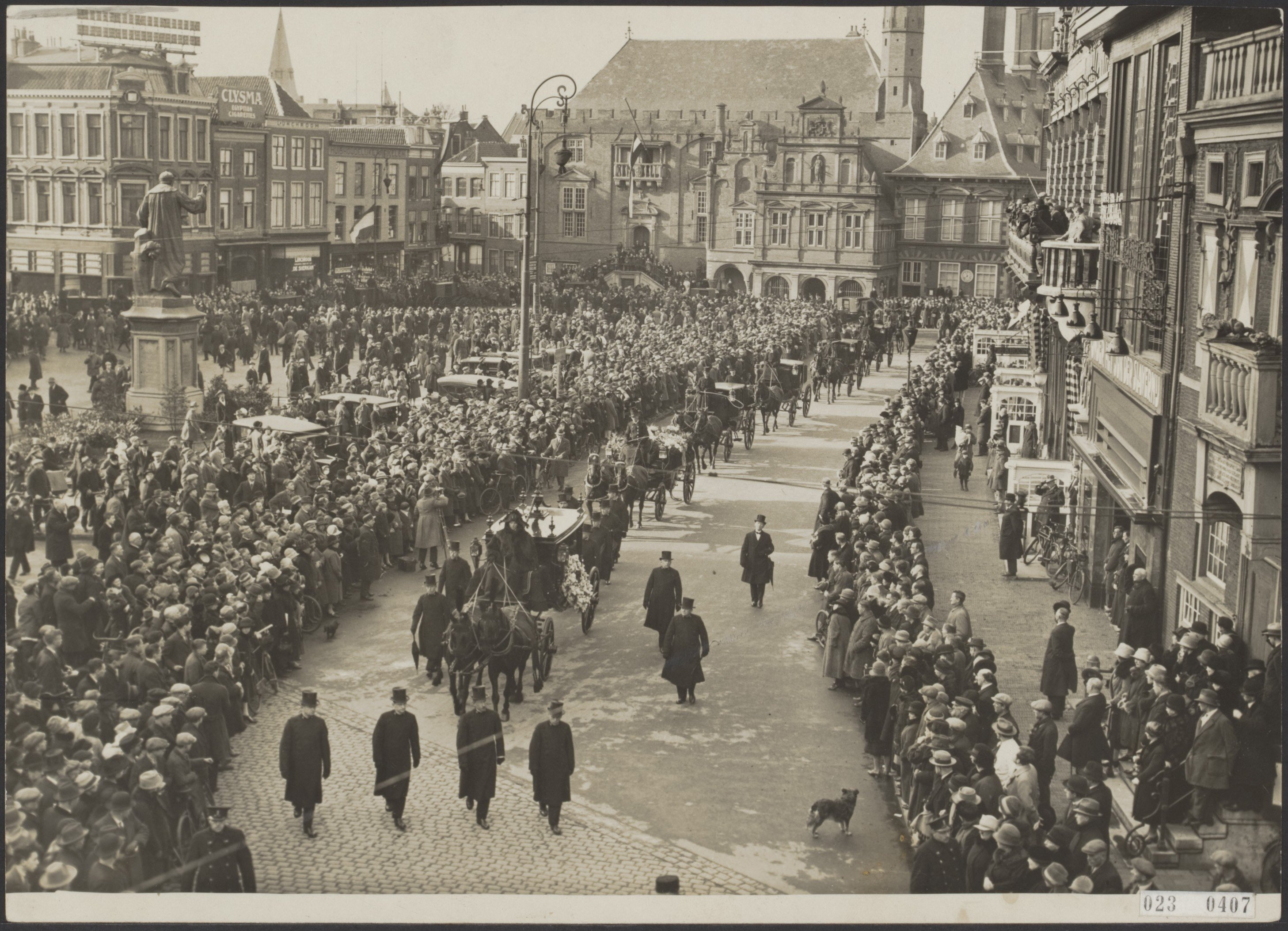
Funeral procession for Lorentz in Haarlem, February 1928.

In January 1928, Lorentz became seriously ill, and died shortly after on 4 February. The respect in which he was held in the Netherlands is apparent from Owen Richardson's description of his funeral:

The funeral took place at Haarlem at noon on Friday, February 10. At the stroke of twelve the State telegraph and telephone services of Holland were suspended for three minutes as a revered tribute to the greatest man the Netherlands has produced in our time. It was attended by many colleagues and distinguished physicists from foreign countries. The President, Sir Ernest Rutherford, represented the Royal Society and made an appreciative oration by the graveside.

— O. W. Richardson

Unique 1928 film footage of the funeral procession with a lead carriage followed by ten mourners, followed by a carriage with the coffin, followed in turn by at least four more carriages, passing by a crowd at the Grote Markt, Haarlem, from the Zijlstraat to the Smedestraat, and then back again through the Grote Houtstraat towards the Barteljorisstraat, on the way to the "Algemene Begraafplaats" at the Kleverlaan (northern Haarlem cemetery), has been digitized on YouTube. Amongst others, the funeral was attended by Albert Einstein and Marie Curie.

== Recognition ==
=== Memberships ===
Year	Organization	Type	Ref.
1881	Royal Netherlands Academy of Arts and Sciences	Member	
1905	Royal Society	Foreign Member	
1906	American Philosophical Society	International Member	
1906	National Academy of Sciences	International Member	
1912	American Academy of Arts and Sciences	International Honorary Member	

=== Awards ===
Year	Organization	Award	Co-recipients	Citation	Ref.
1902	Royal Swedish Academy of Sciences	Nobel Prize in Physics	Pieter Zeeman	"In recognition of the extraordinary service they rendered by their researches into the influence of magnetism upon radiation phenomena."	
1908	Royal Society	Rumford Medal	—	"On the ground[s] of his investigations in optical and electrical science."	
1917	Franklin Institute	Franklin Medal	—	"For researches which have contributed to our knowledge of the nature of light and the ultimate constitution of matter."	
1918	Royal Society	Copley Medal	—	"On the ground[s] of his distinguished researches in mathematical physics."	

=== Honors ===
Year	Country	Honor	Ref.
1908	Germany	Pour le Mérite	

== Tributes ==
According to his biography published by the Nobel Foundation, "It may well be said that Lorentz was regarded by all theoretical physicists as the world's leading spirit, who completed what was left unfinished by his predecessors and prepared the ground for the fruitful reception of the new ideas based on the quantum theory."

Lorentz is considered one of the prime representatives of the "Second Dutch Golden Age," a period of several decades surrounding 1900 in which the natural sciences flourished in the Netherlands.

Richardson describes Lorentz as:

A man of remarkable intellectual powers. Although steeped in his own investigation of the moment, he always seemed to have in his immediate grasp its ramifications into every corner of the universe. The singular clearness of his writings provides a striking reflection of his wonderful powers in this respect. He possessed and successfully employed the mental vivacity which is necessary to follow the interplay of discussion, the insight which is required to extract those statements which illuminate the real difficulties, and the wisdom to lead the discussion among fruitful channels, and he did this so skillfully that the process was hardly perceptible.

M. J. Klein (1967) wrote of Lorentz's reputation in the 1920s:

For many years physicists had always been eager "to hear what Lorentz will say about it" when a new theory was advanced, and, even at seventy-two, he did not disappoint them.

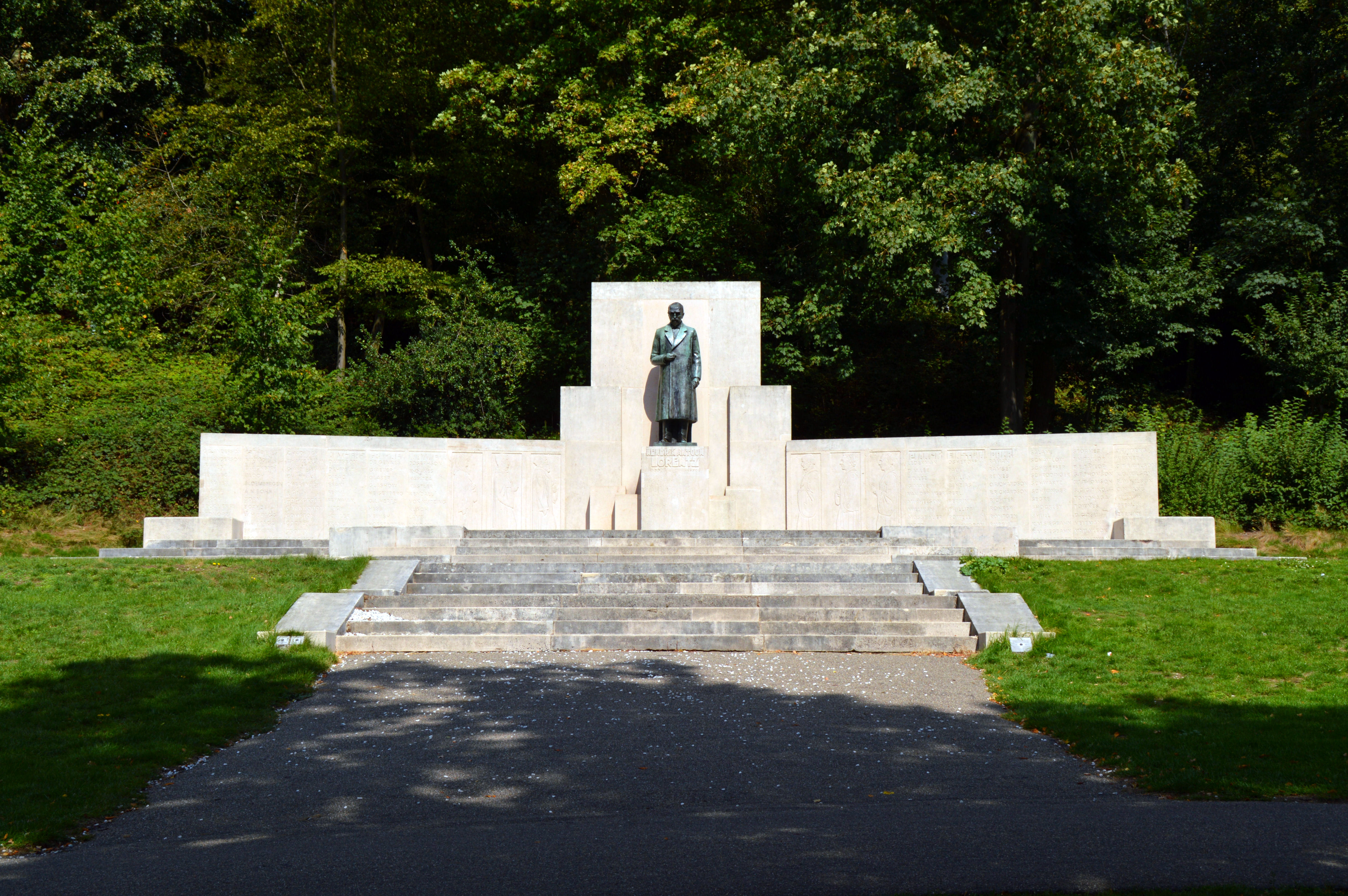
Lorentz-monument Park Sonsbeek in Arnhem.

Einstein wrote of Lorentz:

1928: The enormous significance of his work consisted therein, that it forms the basis for the theory of atoms and for the general and special theories of relativity. The special theory was a more detailed expose of those concepts which are found in Lorentz's research of 1895.
1953: For me personally he meant more than all the others I have met on my life's journey.

Poincaré (1902) said of Lorentz's theory of electrodynamics:

The most satisfactory theory is that of Lorentz; it is unquestionably the theory that best explains the known facts, the one that throws into relief the greatest number of known relations. It is due to Lorentz that the results of Fizeau on the optics of moving bodies, the laws of normal and abnormal dispersion and of absorption are connected with each other. Look at the ease with which the new Zeeman phenomenon found its place, and even aided the classification of Faraday's magnetic rotation, which had defied all Maxwell's efforts.

Paul Langevin (1911) said of Lorentz:

It will be Lorentz's main claim to fame that he demonstrated that the fundamental equations of electromagnetism also allow of a group of transformations that enables them to resume the same form when a transition is made from one reference system to another. This group differs fundamentally from the above group as regards transformations of space and time.''

Lorentz was chairman of the first Solvay Conference held in Brussels in the autumn of 1911. Shortly after the conference, Poincaré wrote an essay on quantum physics which gives an indication of Lorentz's status at the time:

At every moment the twenty physicists from different countries could be heard talking of the [quantum mechanics] which they contrasted with the old mechanics. Now what was the old mechanics? Was it that of Newton, the one which still reigned uncontested at the close of the nineteenth century? No, it was the mechanics of Lorentz, the one dealing with the principle of relativity; the one which, hardly five years ago, seemed to be the height of boldness.

== See also ==
- 29208 Halorentz
- Geertruida de Haas-Lorentz
- Heaviside–Lorentz units
- List of things named after Hendrik Antoon Lorentz
- Lorentz covariance
- Lorentz (crater)
- Lorentz Medal
- Lorentz oscillator model
- Lorentz-violating electrodynamics
- Modern searches for Lorentz violation
- Trouton–Noble experiment

== Publications ==
- Many papers by Lorentz (mostly in English) are available for online viewing in the Proceedings of the Royal Netherlands Academy of Arts and Science, Amsterdam.
- Lorentz, Hendrik Antoon (1900), "Considerations on Gravitation", Proc. Acad. Science Amsterdam, 2: 559–74
- Lorentz, Hendrik Antoon (1927–1931), Lectures on Theoretical Physics (vol. I–III), New York: Macmillan & Co., (Vol. I online)
- Lorentz, H. A. (1909). The Theory of Electrons; and Its Applications to the Phenomena of Light and Radiant Heat; a Course of Lectures Delivered in Columbia University, New York, in March and April 1906. Leipzig: B. G. Teubner.
- Lorentz, Hendrik Antoon (1910) [1913]. "Das Relativitätsprinzip und seine Anwendung auf einige besondere physikalische Erscheinungen" . In Blumenthal, Otto; Sommerfeld, Arnold (eds.). Das Relativitätsprinzip. Eine Sammlung von Abhandlungen. pp. 74–89.
- English Wikisource translation: The Principle of Relativity and its Application to some Special Physical Phenomena
- Lorentz, Hendrik Antoon (1931) [1910], Lectures on theoretical physics, Vol. 3, London: MacMillan
- Lorentz, Hendrik Antoon (1914). Das Relativitätsprinzip. Drei Vorlesungen gehalten in Teylers Stiftung zu Haarlem (1913) . Leipzig and Berlin: B.G. Teubner.
