= Wander Johannes de Haas =

Dutch physicist (1878–1960)

W. J. de Haas
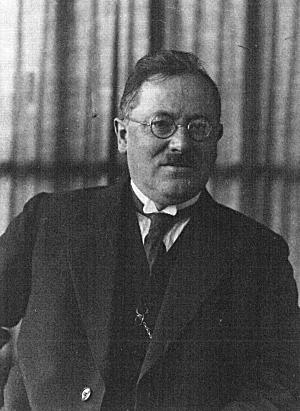
- De Haas in 1925
- Born: 2 March 1878; Lisse, Netherlands
- Died: 26 April 1960 (aged 82); Bilthoven, Netherlands
- Education: University of Leiden
- Known for: De Haas–Van Alphen effect Shubnikov–de Haas effect Einstein–de Haas effect
- Spouse: Geertruida de Haas-Lorentz
- Awards: Rumford Medal (1934)
- Scientific career
- Fields: Physicist
- Workplaces: University of Leiden; TU Delft
- Doctoral advisor: Heike Kamerlingh Onnes
- Other academic advisors: Johannes Petrus Kuenen
- Doctoral students: Cornelis Jacobus Gorter; Gerardus J. Sizoo

Notes
- He was the husband of Geertruida Luberta Lorentz and the son-in-law of Hendrik Lorentz.

Wander Johannes de Haas (2 March 1878 – 26 April 1960) was a Dutch physicist and mathematician. He is best known for the Shubnikov–de Haas effect, the De Haas–Van Alphen effect and the Einstein–de Haas effect.

== Personal life ==
Wander de Haas was born in Lisse, a small town near Leiden. He was the son of Albertus de Haas, principal of the Teacher's College in Middelburg, and Maria Efting. On 22 December 1910 he married physicist Geertruida Luberta Lorentz, the eldest daughter of Hendrik Lorentz. They had two daughters and two sons. He was an atheist.

== Education ==
After attending high school in Middelburg, De Haas started paralegal studies in 1895. After completion of two of three parts of the examinations and having worked in a lawyer's office for some time, he decided to change career and become a physicist instead. After passing the qualifications exams for admission to university, he started to study physics at the University of Leiden in 1900 under Heike Kamerlingh Onnes and Johannes Petrus Kuenen. He earned his doctorate in 1912, under Kamerlingh Onnes, with a thesis entitled: Measurements on the Compressibility of Hydrogen.

== Career ==
After getting his degree, De Haas worked in Berlin as a researcher at the Physikalische Reichsanstalt. Then he returned to the Netherlands, worked as a schoolteacher in Deventer, a conservator of the Teylers Museum in Haarlem, and then a physics professor in Delft Technical School and University of Groningen. In 1925, he became a professor in Leiden, and one of the two heads of the Laboratory of physics, succeeding Kamerlingh Onnes. In 1948, De Haas retired.

An example of the equipment (an electromagnet of c.1930) used for his low-temperature research can be seen in the Boerhaave Museum, the history of science museum in Leiden.

In 1922 he became member of the Royal Netherlands Academy of Arts and Sciences. Twenty years later, in 1942, he was forced to resign. After World War II ended in 1945, he was allowed to rejoin as a member.
