= Induced demand =

Phenomenon in which supply increases lead to a cycle of increased consumption

In transportation planning, induced demand, also called "induced traffic" or consumption of road capacity, has become important in the debate over the expansion of transportation systems, and is often used as an argument against increasing roadway traffic capacity as a cure for congestion. Induced traffic may be a contributing factor to urban sprawl and affordable housing. City planner Jeff Speck has called induced demand "the great intellectual black hole in city planning, the one professional certainty that every thoughtful person seems to acknowledge, yet almost no one is willing to act upon."

The inverse effect, known as reduced demand, is also observed.

== Economics ==
An illustration of latent demand: when the supply curve shifts from S1 to S2, the equilibrium price decreases from P1 to P2, and quantity demanded increases from Q1 to Q2.

"Induced demand" and other terms were given economic definitions in a 1999 paper by Lee, Klein, and Camus. In the paper, "induced traffic" is defined as a change in traffic by movement along the short-run demand curve. This would include new trips made by existing residents, taken because driving on the road is now faster. Likewise, "induced demand" is defined as a change in traffic by movement along the long-run demand curve. This would include all trips made by new residents who moved to take advantage of the wider road.

== In transportation systems ==
=== Definitions ===
According to CityLab:

Induced demand is a catch-all term used for a variety of interconnected effects that cause new roads to quickly fill to capacity. In rapidly growing areas where roads were not designed for the current population, there may be significant latent demand for new road capacity, which causes a flood of new drivers to immediately take to the freeway once the new lanes are open, quickly congesting them again.

But these individuals were presumably already living nearby; how did they get around before the expansion? They may have taken alternative modes of transport, travelled at off-peak hours, or not made those trips at all. That’s why latent demand can be difficult to disentangle from generated demand—the new traffic that is a direct result of the new capacity. (Some researchers try to isolate generated demand as the sole effect of induced demand.)

The technical distinction between the two terms, which are often used interchangeably, is that latent demand is travel that cannot be realised because of constraints. It is thus "pent-up". Induced demand is demand that has been realised, or "generated", by improvements made to transportation infrastructure. Thus, induced demand generates the traffic that had been "pent-up" as latent demand.

=== History ===
Latent demand has been recognised by road traffic professionals for many decades, and was initially referred to as "traffic generation". In the simplest terms, latent demand is demand that exists, but, for any number of reasons, most having to do with human psychology, is suppressed by the inability of the system to handle it. Once additional capacity is added to the network, the demand that had been latent materialises as actual usage.

The effect was recognised as early as 1930, when an executive of a St. Louis, Missouri, electric railway company told the Transportation Survey Commission that widening streets simply produces more traffic, and heavier congestion. In New York, it was clearly seen in the highway-building program of Robert Moses, the "master builder" of the New York City area. As described by Moses's biographer, Robert Caro, in The Power Broker:

During the last two or three years before [the entrance of the United States into World War II], a few planners had ... begun to understand that, without a balanced system [of transportation], roads would not only not alleviate transportation congestion but would aggravate it. Watching Moses open the Triborough Bridge to ease congestion on the Queensborough Bridge, open the Bronx-Whitestone Bridge to ease congestion on the Triborough Bridge and then watching traffic counts on all three bridges mount until all three were as congested as one had been before, planners could hardly avoid the conclusion that "traffic generation" was no longer a theory but a proven fact: the more highways were built to alleviate congestion, the more automobiles would pour into them and congest them and thus force the building of more highways – which would generate more traffic and become congested in their turn in an ever-widening spiral that contained far-reaching implications for the future of New York and of all urban areas.

The same effect had been seen earlier with the new parkways that Moses had built on Long Island in the 1930s and 40s, where

... every time a new parkway was built, it quickly became jammed with traffic, but the load on the old parkways was not significantly relieved.

Similarly, the building of the Brooklyn–Battery Tunnel failed to ease congestion on the Queens-Midtown Tunnel and the three East River bridges, as Moses had expected it to. By 1942, Moses could no longer ignore the reality that his roads were not alleviating congestion in the way he expected them to, but his answer to the problem was not to invest in mass transit, it was to build even more roads, in a vast program which would expand or create 200 miles (300 kilometers) of roads, including additional bridges, such as the Throgs Neck Bridge and the Verrazzano–Narrows Bridge. J. J. Leeming, a British road-traffic engineer and county surveyor between 1924 and 1964, described the phenomenon in his 1969 book, Road Accidents: Prevent or Punish?:

Motorways and bypasses generate traffic, that is, produce extra traffic, partly by inducing people to travel who would not otherwise have done so by making the new route more convenient than the old, partly by people who go out of their direct route to enjoy the greater convenience of the new road, and partly by people who use the towns bypassed because they are more convenient for shopping and visits when through traffic has been removed.

Leeming went on to give an example of the observed effect following the opening of the Doncaster Bypass section of the A1(M) in 1961. By 1998, Donald Chen quoted the British Transport Minister as saying "The fact of the matter is that we cannot tackle our traffic problem by building more roads." In Southern California, a study by the Southern California Association of Governments in 1989 concluded that steps taken to alleviate traffic congestion, such as adding lanes or turning freeways into double-decked roads, would have nothing but a cosmetic effect on the problem. Also, the University of California at Berkeley published a study of traffic in 30 California counties between 1973 and 1990 which showed that every 10 percent increase in roadway capacity, traffic increased by 9 percent within four years time. A 2004 meta-analysis, which took in dozens of previously published studies, confirmed this. It found that:

... on average, a 10 percent increase in lane miles induces an immediate 4 percent increase in vehicle miles travelled, which climbs to 10 percent – the entire new capacity – in a few years.

An aphorism among some traffic engineers is "Trying to cure traffic congestion by adding more capacity is like trying to cure obesity by loosening your belt."

According to city planner Jeff Speck, the "seminal" text on induced demand is the 1993 book The Elephant in the Bedroom: Automobile Dependence and Denial, written by Stanley I. Hart and Alvin L. Spivak.

=== Price of road travel ===
A journey on a road can be considered as having an associated cost or price (the generalised cost, g) which includes the out-of-pocket cost (e.g. fuel costs and tolls) and the opportunity cost of the time spent travelling, which is usually calculated as the product of travel time and the value of travellers' time. These cost determinants change often, and all have variable effects on demand for transport, which tends to be dependent on the reason(s) as well as method of travel.

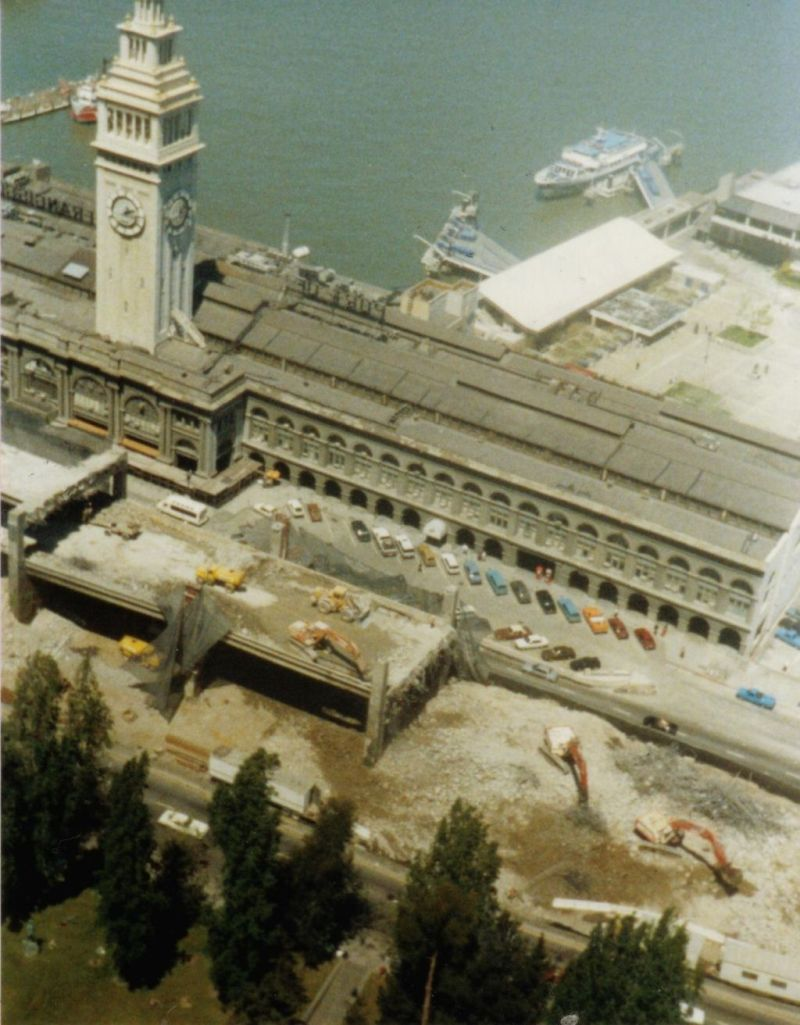
Part of the Embarcadero Freeway in San Francisco being torn down in 1991. The removal of the freeway illustrates the inverse of induced demand, "reduced demand".

When road capacity is increased, initially there is more road space per vehicle travelling than there was before, so congestion is reduced, and therefore the time spent travelling is reduced – reducing the generalised cost of every journey (by affecting the second "cost" mentioned in the previous paragraph). In fact, this is one of the key justifications for construction of new road capacity (the reduction in journey times).

A change in the cost (or price) of travel results in a change in the quantity consumed. Factors such as petrol prices, as well as fuel costs, are the most common variables that influence the quantity demanded for transport. This can be explained using the simple supply and demand theory, illustrated in this figure.

==== Elasticity of transport demand ====
The economic concept of elasticity measures the change in quantity demanded relative to a change in another variable, most commonly price. For roads or highways, the supply relates to capacity and the quantity consumed refers to vehicle miles traveled. The size of the increase in quantity consumed depends on the elasticity of demand.

The elasticity of demand for transport differs significantly depending on the reason people are choosing to travel initially. The clearest example of inelastic demand in this area is commuting, as studies indicate that most people are going to commute to work, regardless of fluctuations in variables such as petrol prices, as it is a required activity to generate income. This exemplifies the fact that activities that yield a high economic benefit, in this case, financial gain in the form of income, tend to be inelastic. In contrast, travel for recreational or social reasons has a low tolerance for price increases, and as such the demand for recreational travel when prices spike sees a sharp decline.

A review of transport research suggests that the elasticity of traffic demand with respect to travel time is around −0.5 in the short term and −1.0 in the long term. This indicates that a 1.0% saving in travel time will generate an additional 0.5% increase in traffic within the first year. In the longer term, a 1.0% saving in travel time will result in a 1.0% increase in traffic volume.

=== Sources of induced traffic ===
In the short term, increased travel on new road space can come from one of two sources: diverted travel and induced traffic. Diverted travel occurs when people divert their trip from another road (change in route) or reschedule their travel to avoid peak period congestion – but if road capacity is expanded, peak congestion is lower and they can travel at the time they prefer.

Induced traffic occurs when new automobile trips are generated. This can occur when people choose to travel by car instead of public transport, or decide to travel when they otherwise would not have.

Shortening travel times can also encourage longer trips as reduced travel costs encourage people to choose farther destinations. Although this may not increase the number of trips, it increases vehicle miles travelled. In the long term, this effect alters land use patterns as people choose homes and workplace locations farther away than they would have without the expanded road capacity. These development patterns encourage automobile dependency which contributes to the high long-term demand elasticities of road expansion.

=== Induced traffic and transport planning ===
Although planners take into account future traffic growth when planning new roads (this often being an apparently reasonable justification for new roads in itself – that traffic growth will mean more road capacity is required), this traffic growth is calculated from increases in car ownership and economic activity, and does not take into account traffic induced by the presence of the new road; that is, it is assumed that traffic will grow, regardless of whether a road is built or not.

In the UK, the idea of induced traffic was used as grounds for protests against government policy of road construction in the 1970s, 1980s and early 1990s, until it became accepted as a given by the government as a result of their own Standing Advisory Committee on Trunk Road Assessment (SACTRA) study of 1994. However, despite the concept of induced traffic now being accepted, it is not always taken into consideration in planning.

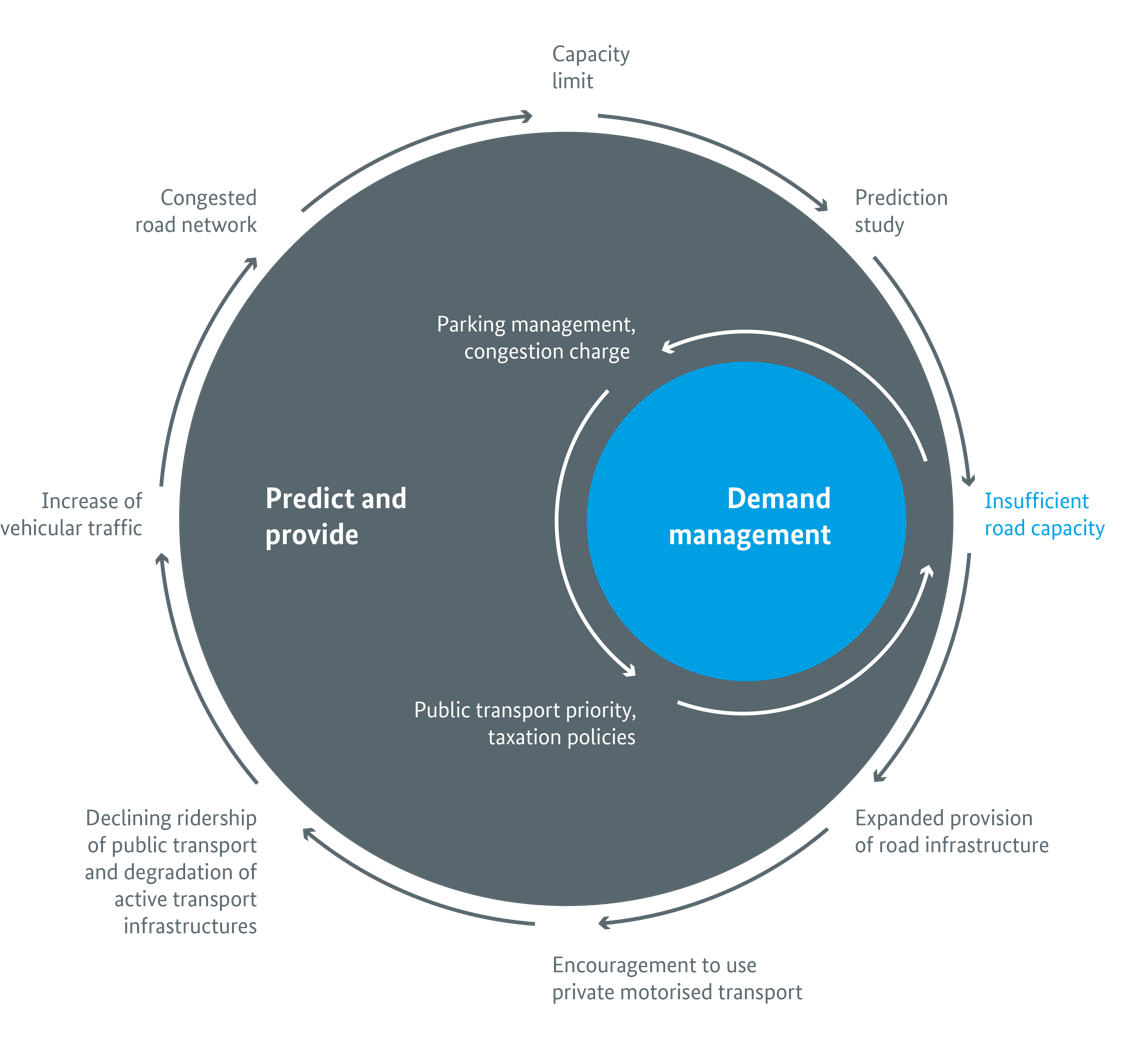
The vicious cycle of predict and provide

A 1998 meta-analysis by the Surface Transportation Policy Project, which used data from the institute, stated that "Metro areas which invested heavily in road capacity expansion fared no better in easing congestion than metro areas that did not."

On the other hand, a comparison of congestion data from 1982 to 2011 by the Texas A&M Transportation Institute suggested that additional roadways reduced the rate of congestion increase. When increases in road capacity were matched to the increase demand, growth in congestion was found to be lower.

A study by Robert Cervero, a professor of City and Regional Planning at the University of California, Berkeley, found that "over a six-to eight-year period following freeway expansion, around twenty percent of added capacity is 'preserved,' and around eighty percent gets absorbed or depleted. Half of this absorption is due to external factors, like growing population and income. The other half is due to induced-demand effects, mostly higher speeds but also increased building activities. These represent California experiences from 1980 to 1994. Whether they hold true elsewhere is of course unknown."

And Mokhtarian et al. (2002) paired eighteen California state highway segments whose capacities had been improved in the early 1970s with control segments that matched the improved segments with regard to facility type, region, approximate size, and initial volumes & congestion levels. Taking annual data for average daily traffic (ADT) and design-hour-traffic-to-capacity (DTC) ratios during the 21 years 1976–1996, they found the growth rates between the two types of segments to be “statistically and practically indistinguishable, suggesting that the capacity expansions, in and of themselves, had a negligible effect on traffic growth”.

=== Policy implications ===
When evaluating induced demand traffic demand theoretically, consideration is mainly given to the actual amount of traffic that will arise from a certain scenario. In real world applications, policymakers must consider the benefits of new infrastructure with the potential negative impacts on the environment, public health, and social equity.

Carbon emissions have become a primary concern for policymakers in recent times and continues to be a consideration for infrastructure planning. An example of this is the Expansion of Heathrow Airport, where hopes of additional runways would spur economic growth within the UK: increasing both the amount and frequency of direct flights. These expansion proposals posed climate concerns and prompted studies into its environmental viability. It was estimated by the government that such expansion plans would create 210.8 million tons of CO_{2} annually. In addition, approximately 700 homes, a church, and eight listed buildings would have to be destroyed to make way for the project. In 2020, the court of appeal ruled the expansion plans illegal due to the ministers’ lack of consideration towards the government’s commitments to climate change.

In contrast to negative externalities, Bogotá, Colombia, has been recognized as a success story in managing induced demand for transportation by investing in new bike infrastructure. The city’s first bike path was established in 1974, with heavy investment in the late 1990s which eventuated in over 300 kilometers of bike lanes and dedicated bike paths. This infrastructure has been credited with reducing traffic congestion through encouraging more people to bike as transport. Less traffic then directly leads to lesser emissions, improved air quality and healthier lifestyles for residents. In addition, the city has implemented additional policies such as a bike-sharing program, bike-friendly streets and education campaigns to promote biking as a healthy and sustainable mode of transportation.

=== Positive effects ===
Steven Polzin, former director of the Center for Urban Transportation Research and former Senior Advisor at the US Department of Transportation, argues that most forms of induced demand are actually good. Specifically, he argues:

1. One type of induced demand is simply keeping up with population growth. This is a good thing.
2. Another is traffic moving out of neighborhoods and onto newly expanded freeways. This is a very good thing.
3. Another is people adjusting timing of trips to their desired timing, thus improving business efficiency and quality of life - both good things.
4. Another is shifting transportation from non-auto transport to auto transport. Polzin does not argue that this is good, but rather that it's irrelevant (at least in a US context) as non-auto transport is such a small fraction of the total, and thus cannot meaningfully induce demand anymore (unlike in the past). By contrast, going in reverse would require unprecedented growth rates in public transport systems even just to keep up with population growth.
5. Another is people taking trips to places that they wouldn't have gone before, such as shopping in new places or living further from work. Beyond arguments that this implies improved quality of life, while this appears to have been a major driver in induced demand in the past, it ignores trends. From 1980 to 2015 increases in road capacity in the US didn't even keep up with population growth, yet vehicle miles per capita doubled - a detachment between capacity growth and demand. But since the late 2000s, vehicle miles per capita have stagnated - and growing trends of telecommuting and e-commerce are likely to apply further downward pressure. I.e.: people don't drive further to shop or work if they're shopping or working from home either way.
6. As personal road travel declines, commercial and service travel increases. This travel is not sensitive to road capacity and is not readily shifted to alternate modes of transportation.

Rather than limiting demand by reducing road capacity, Polzin argues for limiting demand via highway pricing, such as managed lanes, toll highways, congestion pricing or cordon pricing, as this provides a revenue stream which can (among other things) subsidize public transportation.

Similar arguments have also been made by libertarian transportation policy analyst Randal O'Toole, economist William L. Anderson, transportation journalist and Market Urbanist director Scott Beyer, Professor of City and Regional planning Robert Cervero, studies such as from WSP and Rand Europe, and numerous others.

A study found induced demand resulted in more affordable housing.

== Reduced demand (the inverse effect) ==
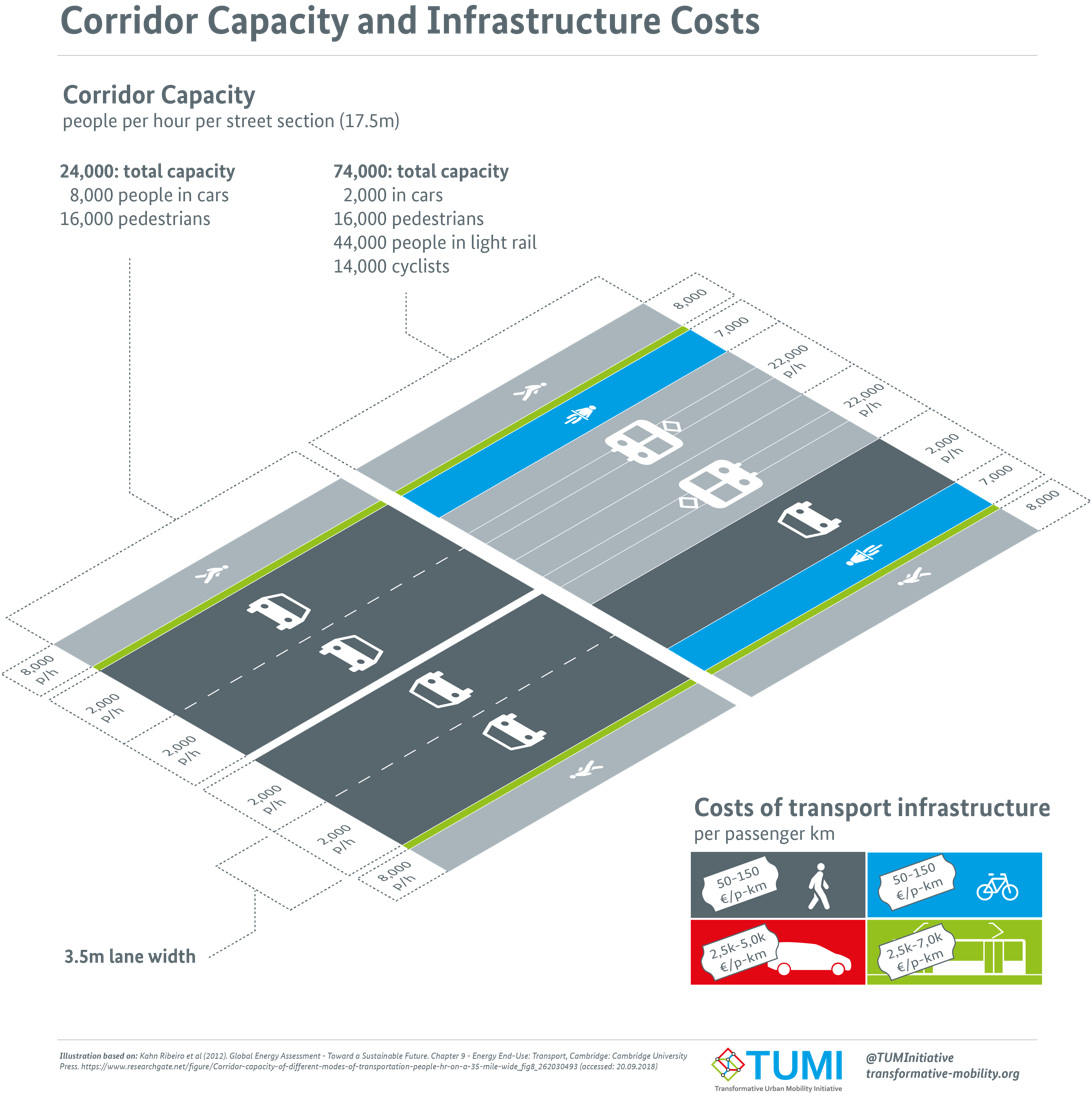
Illustration of motorists, pedestrians, light rail and cyclists with corridor capacity (people per hour per street section) and transport infrastructure costs per passenger kilometer

Just as increasing road capacity reduces the cost of travel and thus increases demand, the reverse is also observed – decreasing road capacity increases the cost of travel, so demand is reduced. This observation, for which there is much empirical evidence, has been called disappearing traffic, also traffic evaporation or traffic suppression, or, more generally, dissuaded demand. So the closure of a road or reduction in its capacity (e.g. reducing the number of available lanes) will result in the adjustment of traveler behavior to compensate – for example, people might stop making particular trips to patronize local businesses, condense multiple trips into one, re-time their trips to a less congested time, use online shopping with free shipping, or switch to public transport, carpooling, walking, bicycling or smaller motor vehicles less affected by road diets, such as motorcycles, depending upon the values of those trips or of the schedule delay they experience.

=== Studies ===
In 1994, the UK advisory committee SACTRA carried out a major review of the effect of increasing road capacity for trunk roads and motorways only, and reported that the evidence suggested such increases often resulted in substantial increases in the volume of traffic. Following this, London Transport and the Department of the Environment, Transport and the Regions commissioned a study to see if the reverse also occurred, namely that when road capacity was reduced, there would be a reduction in traffic. This follow-up study was carried out by Sally Cairns, Carmen Hass-Klau and Phil Goodwin, with an Annex by Ryuichi Kitamura, Toshiyuki Yamamoto and Satoshi Fujii, and published as a book in 1998. A third study was carried out by Sally Cairns, Steve Atkins and Phil Goodwin, and published in the journal Municipal Engineer in 2002.

The 1998 study referred to about 150 sources of evidence, of which the most important were about 60 case studies in the UK, Germany, Austria, Switzerland, Italy, The Netherlands, Sweden, Norway, the US, Canada, Tasmania and Japan. They included major town centre traffic schemes to make pedestrian areas closed to traffic, bus priority measures (especially bus lanes), bridge and road closures for maintenance, and closures due to natural disasters, mostly earthquakes. The 2002 study added some extra case studies, including some involving cycle lanes. The Annex by Kitamura and his colleagues reported a detailed study of the effects of the Hanshin-Awaji earthquake in Japan.

Taking the results as a whole, there was an average reduction of 41% of the traffic flows on the roads whose capacity had been reduced, of which rather less than half could be detected as reappearing on alternative routes. Thus, on average, about 25% of the traffic disappeared. Analysis of surveys and traffic counts indicated that the disappearance was accounted for by between 15 and 20 different behavioural responses, including changing to other modes of transport, changing to other destinations, a reduction in the frequency of trips, and car-sharing. There was a large variation around these average results, with the biggest effects seen in large-scale pedestrianisation in German town centres, and the smallest seen in small-scale temporary closures with good alternative routes, and small reductions in capacity in uncongested streets. In a few cases, there was actually an increase in the volume of traffic, notably in towns which had closed some town centre roads at the same time as opening a new by-pass.

Cairns et al. concluded that:

... the findings reinforce the overall conclusion of the original study—namely, that well-designed and well-implemented schemes to reallocate roadspace away from general traffic can help to improve conditions for pedestrians, cyclists or public transport users, without significantly increasing congestion or other related problems.

The European Union have produced a manual titled "Reclaiming city streets for people" that presents case studies and methodologies for traffic evaporation in urban areas.

=== Real-world examples ===
An early example of the reduced demand effect was described by Jane Jacobs in her classic 1961 book The Death and Life of Great American Cities. Jacobs and others convinced New York City to close the street that split Greenwich Village's Washington Square Park in two, and also not to widen the surrounding streets to service the extra capacity they were expected to carry because of the closing of the street. The city's traffic engineers expected the result to be chaos, but, in fact, the extra traffic never appeared, as drivers instead avoided the area entirely.

Two widely known examples of reduced demand occurred in San Francisco, California, and in Manhattan, New York City, where, respectively, the Embarcadero Freeway and the lower portion of the elevated West Side Highway were torn down after sections of them collapsed. Concerns were expressed that the traffic which had used these highways would overwhelm local streets, but, in fact, the traffic, instead of being displaced, for the most part disappeared entirely. A New York State Department of Transportation study showed that 93% of the traffic which had used the West Side Highway was not displaced, but simply vanished.

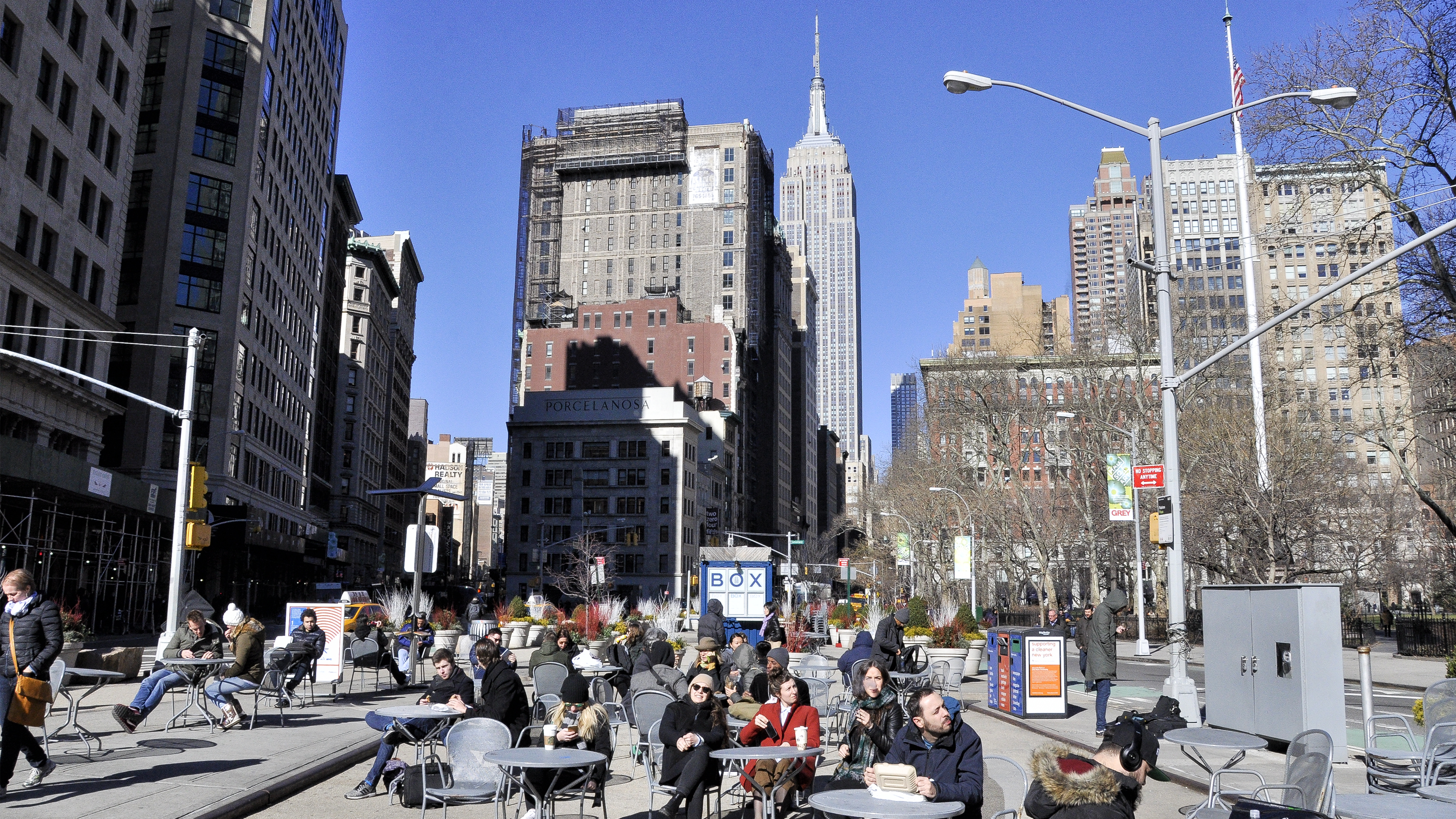
A pedestrian plaza on Broadway at Madison Square; the Empire State Building is in the background; Broadway is reduced at this spot to a single lane (on the right)

After these examples, other highways, including portions of Harbor Drive in Portland, Oregon, the Park East Freeway in Milwaukee, Wisconsin, the Central Freeway in San Francisco, and the Cheonggyecheon Freeway in Seoul, South Korea, were torn down, with the same effect observed.

The argument is also made to convert roads previously open to vehicular traffic into pedestrian areas, with a positive impact on the environment and congestion, as in the example of the central area of Florence, Italy. In New York City, after Mayor Michael Bloomberg's plan for congestion pricing in Manhattan was rejected by the New York State Assembly, portions of Broadway at Times Square, Herald Square and Madison Square were converted into pedestrian plazas, and traffic lanes in other areas taken out of service in favor of protected bike lanes, reducing the convenience of using Broadway as a through-route. As a result, traffic on Broadway was reduced, and the speed of traffic in the area lessened. Another measure instituted was the replacement of through-lanes on some of Manhattan's north–south avenues with dedicated left-turn lanes and protected bike lanes, reducing the avenues' carrying capacity. The Bloomberg administration was able to put these changes into effect as they did not require approval from the state legislature.

Despite the success of the Broadway pedestrian plazas in Manhattan, some pedestrian malls in the US, in which all traffic is removed from shopping streets, have not been successful. Areas with sufficient population density or pedestrian traffic are more likely to successfully pursue this path. Of the approximately 200 pedestrian malls created in the US from the 1970s on, only about 30 remained as of 2012, and many of these became poorer areas of their cities, as lack of accessibility caused commercial property values to decline. The exceptions, including the Third Street Promenade in Santa Monica, California, and 16th Street in Denver, Colorado, are indicators that conversion of shopping streets to pedestrian malls can be successful. Some of the failed pedestrian malls have improved by allowing limited automobile traffic to return. Pedestrian zones are common across cities and towns in Europe.

== See also ==
- Braess's paradox
- Downs–Thomson paradox
- Effects of the car on societies
- Externality
- Hedonic treadmill
- Jevons paradox
- Highway Beautification Act
- Lewis–Mogridge position
- Marchetti's constant
- Say's law
- Schedule delay
- Traffic flow
- Tragedy of the commons
- Nudge theory
