= Downs–Thomson paradox =

Paradox in traffic engineering related to improvements in the road network

The Downs–Thomson paradox (named after Anthony Downs and John Michael Thomson), also known as the Pigou–Knight–Downs paradox (after Arthur Cecil Pigou and Frank Knight), states that the equilibrium speed of car traffic on a road network is determined by the average door-to-door speed of equivalent journeys taken by public transport or the next best alternative.

Although consistent with economic theory, it is a paradox in that it contradicts the common expectation that improvements in the road network will reduce traffic congestion. In actuality, any improvements in road networks lead to no alleviation of congestion, but usually more use of those roads: what is often referred to as induced demand. Improvements to the road network may even make congestion worse if the improvements make public transport more inconvenient to use, or if they shift investment, causing disinvestment in the public transport system.

== Consequence ==
The general conclusion, if the paradox applies, is that expanding a road system as a remedy to congestion is ineffective and often even counterproductive. That is known as Lewis–Mogridge position and was extensively documented by Martin Mogridge in the case study of London on his 1990 book Travel in Towns: Jam Yesterday, Jam Today and Jam Tomorrow?

A 1968 article by Dietrich Braess pointed out the existence of the counterintuitive occurrence on networks: Braess's paradox states that adding extra capacity to a network, when the moving entities selfishly choose their route, can in some cases, reduce overall performance.

There is interest in the study of this phenomenon since the same may happen in computer networks as well as transport networks. Increasing the size of the network is characterized by behaviors of users similar to that of travelers on road networks, who act independently and in a decentralized manner in choosing optimal routes between origin and destination is an extension of the induced demand theory and consistent with Downs' 1992 theory of "triple convergence", formulated to explain the difficulty of removing peak congestion from highways. In response to a capacity addition three immediate effects occur: drivers using alternative routes begin to use the expanded highway; those previously traveling at off-peak times (either immediately before or after the peak) shift to the peak (rescheduling behavior as defined previously) and public transport users shift to driving.

According to Downs, "When peak-hour travel equilibrium has been reached between the subway system and the major commuting roads, then the travel time required for any given trip is roughly equal on both modes."

== See also ==
- Braess's paradox
- Induced demand
- Marchetti's constant, a corollary of which is that decreasing congestion may increase the distance people are willing to commute and so increase the traffic burden
- Lewis–Mogridge position
- Jevons paradox, an increase in efficiency tends to increase (rather than decrease) the rate of consumption of that resource
- Unused highway – Roads that were closed or never used
