= Lewis–Mogridge position =

Theory of road traffic

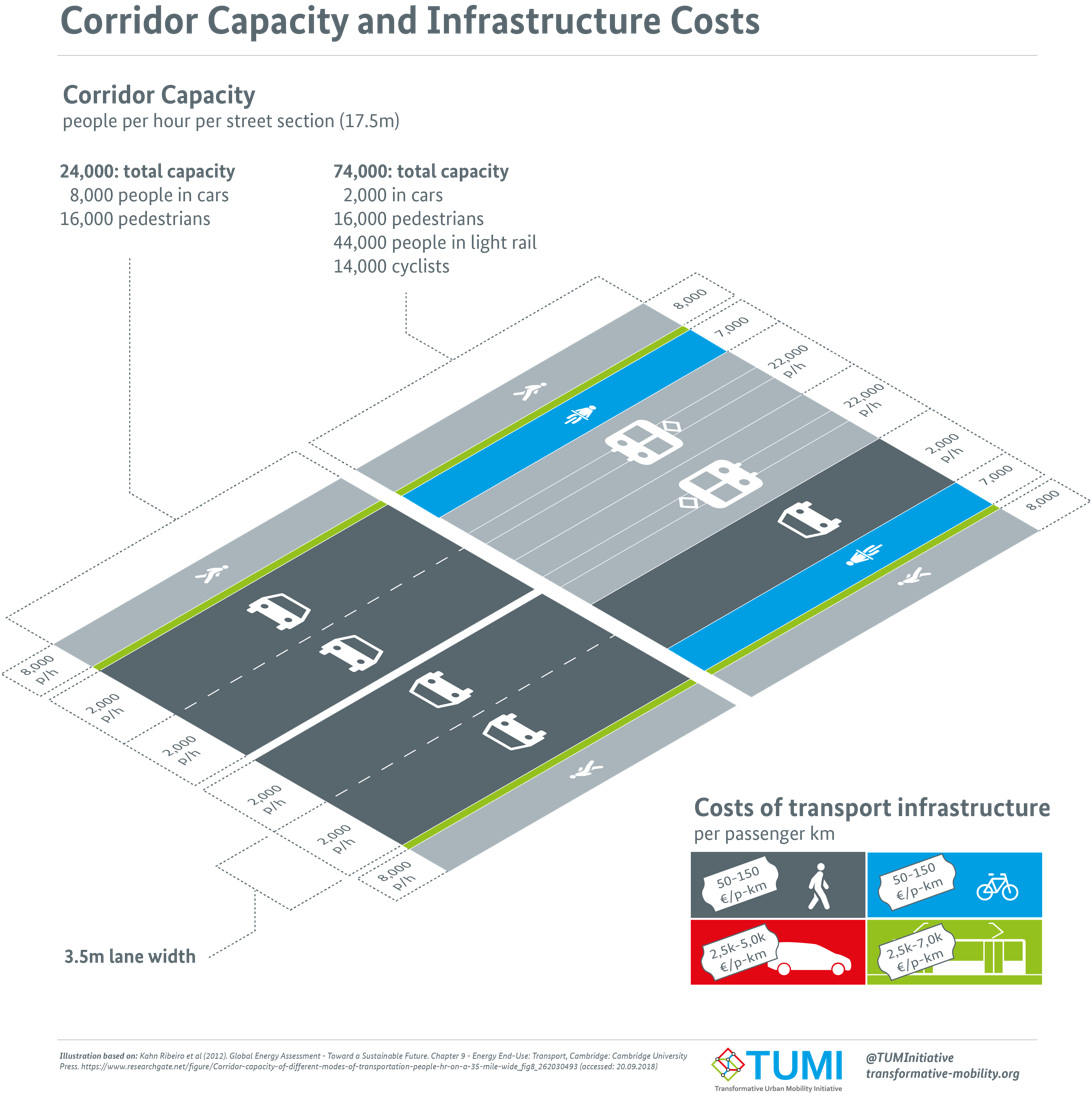
Illustration of motorists, pedestrians, light rail and cyclists with corridor capacity (people per hour per street section) and transport infrastructure costs per passenger kilometer

The Lewis–Mogridge position, named after David Lewis and Martin J. H. Mogridge, was formulated in 1990 and observes that as more roads are built, more traffic consequently fills these roads. Speed gains from some new roads can disappear within months, if not weeks. Sometimes, new roads help to reduce traffic jams, but, in most cases, the congestion is only shifted to another junction.

The position reads traffic expands to meet the available road space (Mogridge, 1990). It is generally referred to as induced demand in the transport literature, and was posited as the "Iron Law of Congestion" by Anthony Downs. It is a special case of Jevons paradox (where the resource in question is traffic capacity), and relates to Marchetti's constant (average commute times are similar in widely varying conditions).

The Lewis-Mogridge position does not hold that new roads are never justified. Rather, it argues that road development should be evaluated in the context of the entire transport system, taking into account not only how goods and people move, but also why they move.

The position is often used to understand problems caused by private transport such as congested roads in cities and on motorways. It can also be used to explain the success of schemes such as the London congestion charge.

The position, however, is not confined to private transport. Mogridge, a British transport researcher, concluded also that all road investment in a congested urban area will have the effect of reducing the average speed of the transport system as a whole: road and public transport. The relationship and overall equilibria are also known as the "Downs–Thomson paradox". However, according to Downs, the link between average speeds on public transport and private transport applies only "to regions in which the vast majority of peak-hour commuting is done on rapid transit systems with separate rights of way. Central London is an example, since in 2001 around 85 percent of all morning peak-period commuters into that area used public transit (including 77 percent on separate rights of way) and only 11 percent used private cars. When peak-hour travel equilibrium has been reached between the subway system and the major commuting roads, then the travel time required for any given trip is roughly equal on both modes."

== See also ==
- Braess's paradox, which states that adding a road to a road network can slow the traffic, and to Marchetti's constant.
- Jevons paradox and rebound effect
- John Glen Wardrop
- Marchetti's constant, a corollary of which is that decreasing congestion may increase the distance people are willing to commute, thereby increasing the traffic burden
- Mohring effect
- Parkinson's law – Adage that work expands to fill its available time
- Wirth's law, a similar effect in computing
- Unused highway – Roads that were closed or never used

== Sources ==
- Mogridge, Martin J. H., Travel in towns: jam yesterday, jam today and jam tomorrow? Macmillan Press, London, 1990. ISBN 0-333-53204-X
- Lewis D. (1977), Estimating the influence of public policy on road traffic levels in greater London. J. Transport Econ. Policy, 11, pp. 155–168.
- Clément, L., La conjecture de MJH Mogridge : test sur l’agglomération de Lyon (PDF), Cahiers Scientifiques du Transport (30), 1995.
- Afimeimounga, H., Solomon, W., Ziedins, I. The Downs–Thomson Paradox: Existence, Uniqueness and Stability of User Equilibria, Queueing Systems: Theory and Applications archive, Volume 49, Issue 3–4 (January 2005).
- Mogridge, M. J. H., Holden, D. J., Bird, J. and Terzis, G. C. "The Downs–Thomson paradox and the transportation planning process". International Journal of Transportation Economics, 14, pp. 283–311, 1987.
