= World domination =

Hypothetical world power structure

World domination (also called global domination, world conquest, or global conquest) is a hypothetical power structure in which a single political authority holds power over all or virtually all the inhabitants of Earth.

Various rulers or regimes have tried to achieve this goal in history. Global conquest was never attained. However, the matter is more complex with indirect or informal domination. Many historians, political scientists and policy-makers argue that the United States attained global hegemony since 1945 or 1991, or even the British Empire in the 19th century.

The theme of world domination has often been used in works of fiction, particularly in political fiction, as well as in conspiracy theories (which may posit that some person or group has already secretly achieved this goal), particularly those fearing the development of a "New World Order" involving a world government of a totalitarian nature. (Note: see the following:)

== History ==
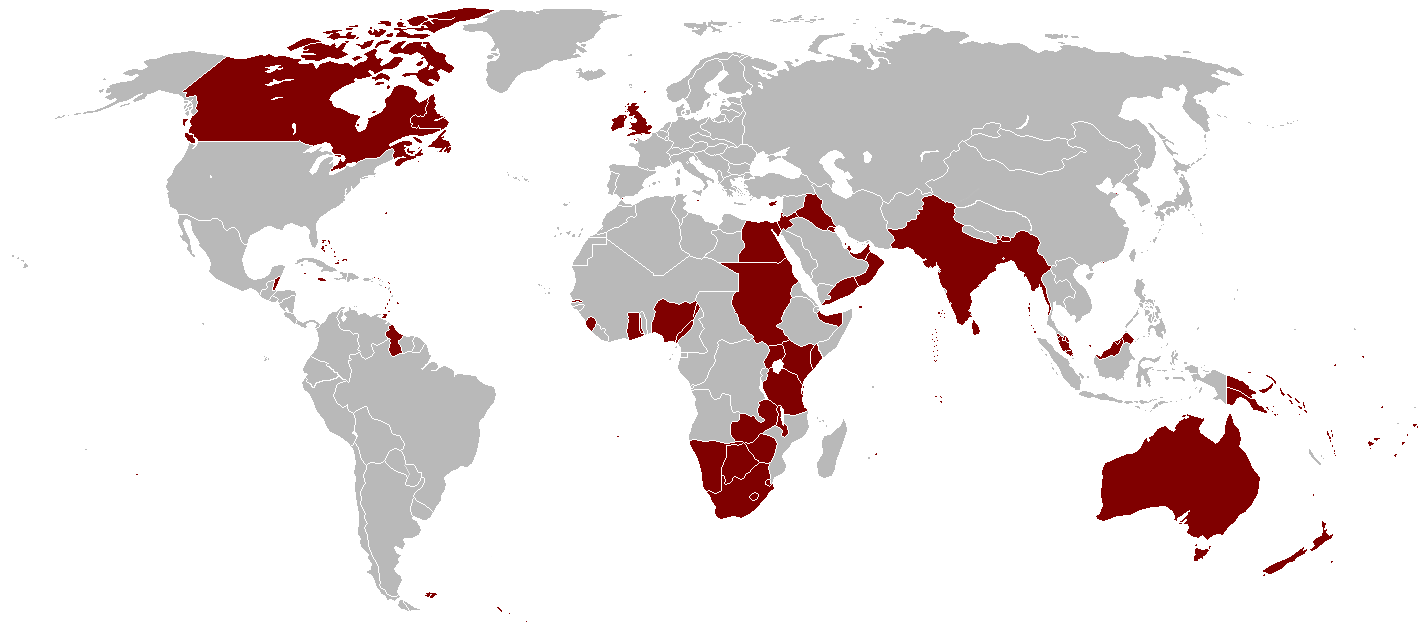
The British Empire at its territorial peak in 1921

While various empires and hegemonies over the course of history have been able to expand and dominate large parts of the world, none have come close to conquering all the territory on Earth. However, these powers have had a global impact in cultural and economic terms that is still felt today. Some of the largest and more prominent empires include:

- The Roman Empire was established by the late-Republican state of ancient Rome. The republican government turned into imperial following Octavian's assumption of sole rule under the Principate in 31 BC. Since Octavian, the Empire was ruled by emperors. It included territory in Europe, North Africa, and Western Asia. The fall of the Western Roman Empire in 476 conventionally marks the end of classical antiquity and the beginning of the Middle Ages.
- The Mongol Empire, which in the 13th century under Genghis Khan came to control the largest continuous land empire in the world, spanning from East Asia to the Middle East and Eastern Europe. It eventually fractured and ended with the fall of the Yuan dynasty, which was established by Kublai Khan. It reached its greatest extent in 1309, when it controlled the region through which the Silk Road trade route ran.
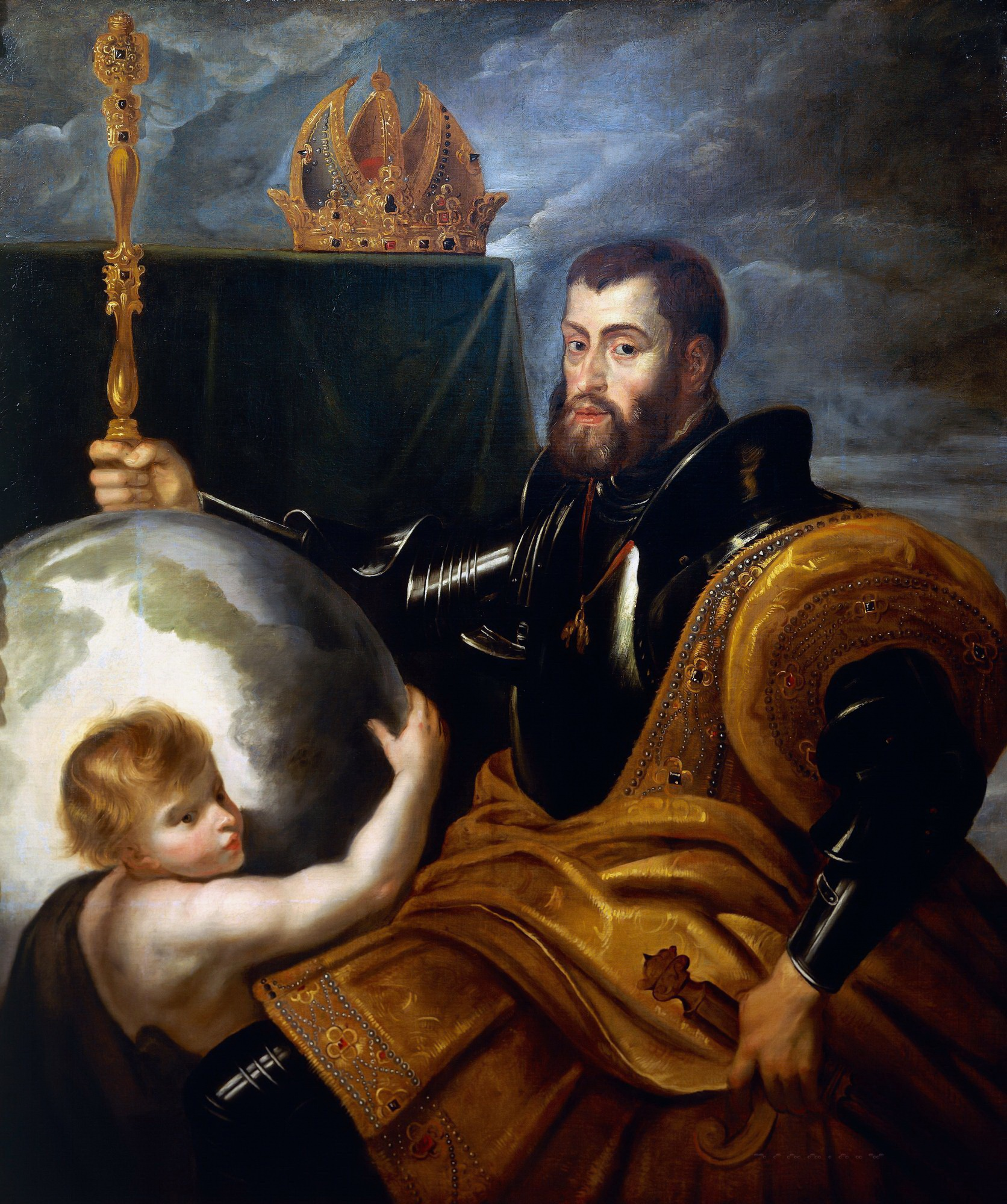
- Charles I of Spain and V of the Holy Roman Empire, who aspired to be a universal monarch and who came close to Dominium mundi
  The Spanish Empire under the Habsburg monarchy and Iberian Union, which controlled vast areas of Europe, the Americas, Africa and some parts of Asia. The empire collapsed in a process that started in the Thirty Years' War and the Napoleonic Wars. It was the first global empire in human history, being the first referred to as the empire on which the sun never sets and having pretensions (especially during the Spanish Habsburg era) to being the secular leaders of worldwide Christendom and the sword of the Pope against their opponents, the Protestant Reformers of Northern Europe, the Regalism of the Kingdom of France, the Islamic world, pagans from the West Indies and East Indies, and all the enemies of the Catholic Church in their Christian mission to evangelise the world.
- The Russian Empire, which controlled vast areas of Eurasia stretching from the Baltic region to Outer Manchuria, reaching its largest extent in 1895. The empire collapsed during the February Revolution in 1917, which saw Tsar Nicholas II abdicate. The cultural and economic unity of the Russian Empire allowed the rise of its successor state, the Soviet Union, a superpower whose military strength and ideology were major forces in global politics during the 20th century.
- The British Empire, originating under Elizabeth I, was the largest empire in history. By 1921, the British Empire reached its height and dominated a quarter of the globe, controlling territory on each continent. The empire went through a long period of decline and decolonization following the end of the Second World War, which had brought it close to bankruptcy, until it ceased to be a dominant force in world affairs. English is still the official language in many countries, most of which were former British colonies, and is widely spoken as a second language around the world. The Industrial Revolution that took place in the United Kingdom from the 18th century was spread to the rest of the globe through the expansion of the British Empire, enabling the development of an industrialized global economy.
- The American Empire is a disputed concept referring to the sphere of informal and indirect domination by the United States. According to proponents of the concept, the history of the American Empire begins in the Latin America following the Monroe Doctrine in 1823, extends to the non-Soviet sphere of the Old World since 1945 and to the post-Soviet space in Europe since 1991. In size, the US Empire exceeds the British Empire and some scholars claim that the US Empire is global in scope.

By the early 21st century, wars of territorial conquest were uncommon and the world's nations could attempt to resolve their differences through multilateral diplomacy under the auspices of global organizations like the United Nations, World Trade Organization, or, with equal perspectives, the Pope. A more secure strategy was allying with the United States, as did almost all developed states and many others. In modern times, the world's superpowers and potential superpowers rarely attempt to exert global influence through the types of territorial empire-building seen in history, but the world's leading superpower permanently exerts global influence through the type of non-territorial empire-building also seen in history:

History tells us that conquest and annexation are not the only means, or indeed the most frequent and most effective means, by which empires have been built up in the past. The history of the Roman Empire’s growth, for instance, is instructive when one is considering the present-day American Empire’s structure and prospects. The principal method by which Rome established her political supremacy in her world was by taking her weaker neighbors under her wing and protecting them against her and their stronger neighbors; Rome’s relation with these protegees of hers was a treaty relation. Juridically they retained their previous status of sovereign independence.

Domination, according to Michael W. Doyle, is possible without territorial conquest. Some international relations display all features of territorial conquest except a conqueror’s flag. The influence of historical territorial empires is still important and the non-territorial world domination is practiced.

== Ideologies ==
By 500 BC, Darius the Great had created the largest empire up until that time, but it was still only a fraction of the land and people of the Earth.

The aspiration to rule 'the four corners of the universe' has been the hallmark of imperial ideologies worldwide since the beginning of history.

=== Egypt ===
The Egyptian King was believed to rule 'all under the sun.' On Abydos Stelae, Thutmose I claimed: "I made the boundaries of Egypt as far as the sun encircles." The Story of Sinuke tells that the King has "subdued all that the sun encircles." The Hymn of Victory of Thutmose III and the Stelae of Amenophis II proclaimed that no one makes a boundary with the King and there is "no boundary for him towards all lands united, towards all lands together." Thutmose III was also acknowledged: "None presents himself before thy majesty. The circuit of the Great Circle [Ocean] is included in thy grasp."

=== Mesopotamia ===
The prestigious title of King of the Universe appeared in Ancient Mesopotamia, being used by powerful monarchs claiming world domination, starting with the Akkadian king Sargon (2334–2284 BC). It was used in a succession of later empires claiming symbolical descent from Sargon's Akkadian Empire. During the early dynastic period in Mesopotamia (c. 2900–2350 BC), the rulers of the region's city-states (such as Ur, Uruk, Lagash, Umma, and Kish) would often launch invasions into regions and cities far from their own, generally with negligible consequences for themselves, in order to establish temporary and small empires to either gain or keep a superior position relative to the other city-states. Eventually this quest to be more prestigious and powerful than the other city-states resulted in a general ambition for universal rule. Since Mesopotamia was equated to correspond to the entire world and Sumerian cities had been built far and wide (cities the like of Susa, Mari and Assur were located near the perceived corners of the world) it seemed possible to reach the edges of the world (at this time thought to be the lower sea, the Persian gulf, and the upper sea, the Mediterranean). The title šar kiššatim was perhaps most prominently used by the kings of the Neo-Assyrian Empire, more than a thousand years after the fall of the Akkadian Empire.

=== Persia ===
After taking Babylon and defeating the Neo-Babylonian Empire, Cyrus the Great proclaimed himself "King of Babylon, King of Sumer and Akkad, King of the Four Corners of the World" in the famous Cyrus Cylinder, an inscription deposited in the foundations of the Esagila temple dedicated to the chief Babylonian god, Marduk. Cyrus the Great's dominions composed the largest empire the world had seen to that point, spanning from the Mediterranean Sea and Hellespont in the west to the Indus River in the east. Iranian philosophy, literature and religion played dominant roles in world events for the next millennium, with the Cyrus Cylinder considered the oldest-known declaration of human rights. Before Cyrus and his army crossed the river Araxes to fight the Armenians, he installed his son, Cambyses II, as king in case he should not return from battle. However, once Cyrus had crossed the river, he had a vision in which Darius had wings atop his shoulders and stood upon the confines of Europe and Asia (the known world). When Cyrus awoke from the dream, he interpreted it as signaling a great danger to the future security of the empire, as it meant that Darius would one day rule the whole world. However, his son Cambyses was the heir to the throne, not Darius, causing Cyrus to wonder if Darius was forming treasonable and ambitious designs. This led Cyrus to order Hystaspes to go back to Persis and watch over his son strictly, until Cyrus himself returned. In many cuneiform inscriptions, like the Behistun Inscription, Darius the Great presents himself as a devout believer of Ahura Mazda, perhaps even convinced that he had a divine right to rule over the world, believing that because he lived righteously by Asha, Ahura Mazda supported him as a virtuous monarch and appointed him to rule the Achaemenid Empire and their global projection, while believing through his dualist beliefs that each rebellion in his empire was the work of Druj, the enemy of Asha.

=== Alexander the Great ===
In the 4th century BCE, Alexander the Great notably expressed a desire to conquer the world, and a legend persists that after he completed his military conquest of the known ancient world, he "wept because he had no more worlds to conquer", as he was unaware of China farther to the east and had no way to know about civilizations in the Americas. Derivative characters of Alexander the Great, such as Sa'b Dhu Marathid in the south Arabian tradition, were also presented as world conquerors.

After the collapse of the Macedonian Empire, the Seleucid Empire appeared with claims to world rule in their imperial ideology, as Antiochus I Soter claimed the ancient Mesopotamian title King of the Universe. However, it didn't reflect realistic Seleucid imperial ambitions at this point after the peace treaty of Seleucus I Nicator with the Mauryans had set a limit to eastern expansion, and Antiochus ceding the lands west of Thrace to the Antigonids.

=== India ===
In Indian mythology, Bharata Chakravartin was the first chakravartin (universal emperor, ruler of rulers or possessor of chakra) of Avasarpini (the present half time cycle as per Jain cosmology). In a Jain legend, Yasasvati Devi, the most senior queen of Rishabhanatha (the first Jain tirthankara), saw four auspicious dreams one night. She saw the sun and the moon, Mount Meru, the lake with swans, the Earth and the ocean. Rishabhanatha explained to her that these dreams meant that a chakravartin ruler will be born to them who will conquer the whole world. Then, Bharata, a Kshatriya from the Ikshvaku dynasty, was born to them on the ninth day of the dark half of the month of Chaitra. He is said to have conquered all the six parts of the world, during his digvijaya (winning six divisions of earth in all directions), and fought his brother, Bahubali, to conquer the last remaining city. The ancient name of India was named "Bhāratavarsha" or "Bhārata" or "Bharata-bhumi" after him. The Hindu text Skanda Purana (chapter 37) has it that "Rishabhanatha was the son of Nabhiraja, and Rishabha had a son named Bharata, and after the name of this Bharata, this country is known as Bharata-varsha." After completing his world-conquest, he is said to have proceeded to his capital Ayodhyapuri with a huge army and the divine chakra-ratna (a spinning, disk-like super weapon with serrated edges).

According to legend, King Vikramaditya's Empire spread across the Middle East and East Asia (even reaching modern Indonesia), with Vikramaditya a great Hindu world emperor (or Chakravarti). This probably inspired the imperial pretensions of Chandragupta II and Skandagupta, as the term Vikramaditya is also used as a title by several Hindu monarchs. According to P. N. Oak and Stephen Knapp, king Vikrama’s empire extended up to Europe and the whole of Jambudvip (Indian subcontinent). But, according to most historical texts, his empire was located in present-day northern India and Pakistan, implying that the historic Vikramaditya only ruled Bharat as far as the River Indus, as per Bhavishya Purana. There is no epigraphic evidence to suggest that his rule extended to Europe, Arabia, Central Asia or Southeast Asia. (Sources of contemporaneous empires, like the Parthians, Kushans, Chinese, Romans and Sassanids, don't mention an empire ruling from Arabia to Indonesia.) That part of his rule is considered to be legend, as Indic religious conceptions of the Indian subcontinent as being 'the world' (with the term Jambudvīpa used broadly in the same way), and how that translates into folk memories.

The Mahabharata or Somadeva's Kathasaritsagara has pretensions of world domination, as performing some mystic ritual and virtues would be a signal of becoming emperor of the whole world, just as Dharma has universal jurisdiction over all the cosmos. In this epic there was a time when Emperor Yudhishthira ruled over 'the world': as from Śuciratha will come the son named Vṛṣṭimān, and his son, Suṣeṇa, will be the emperor of the entire world. There are signs in Bāṇabhaṭṭa that an emperor named Harsha shall arise, who will rule over all the continents like Harishchandra, who will conquer the world like Mandhatri. But 'the world', in the time of Ramayana in the 12th century BCE and Mahabharata in the 5th century BCE, was only India. Some pan-Indian empires, like the Maurya Empire, were seeking domination first of the ancient world known to Indians in the Akhand Bharat, and then through conflict with the Seleucid Empire. Ashoka the great was a devout Buddhist and wanted to establish it as a world religion. Also, the first references to a Chakravala Chakravartin (an emperor who rules over all four of the continents) appears in monuments from the time of the early Maurya Empire, in the 4th to 3rd century BCE, in reference to Chandragupta Maurya and his grandson Ashoka.

=== China ===
In the Sinosphere, one of the consequences of the Mandate of Heaven in Imperial China was the claim of the Emperor of China as Son of Heaven who ruled tianxia (meaning 'all under heaven', closely associated with civilization and order in classical Chinese philosophy), which in English can be translated as 'ruler of the whole world', being equivalent to the concept of a universal monarch. The title was interpreted literally only in China and Japan, whose monarchs were referred to as demigods, deities, or 'living gods', chosen by the gods and goddesses of heaven. The theory behind this derives from Confucian bureaucracy: the Chinese emperor acted as the autocrat of tianxia and held a mandate to rule over everyone else in the world, as long as he served the people well. If the quality of rule became questionable because of repeated natural disasters such as flood or famine, or for other reasons, then rebellion was justified. This important concept legitimized the dynastic cycle, or change of dynasties. The center of this world-view was not exclusionary in nature, and outer groups, such as ethnic minorities and foreigners who accepted the mandate of the Chinese Emperor (through annexation or living in tributary states), were themselves received and included into tianxia. The concept's 'inclusion of all' and implied acceptance of the world's diversity, emphasizing harmonious reciprocal dependence and rule by virtue as a means to lasting peace. Although in practice there would be areas of the known world which were not under the control of the Chinese monarch ('barbarians'), in Chinese political theory the rulers of those areas derived their power from the Chinese monarch (Sinocentrism). This principle was exemplified with the goal of Qin Shi Huang to "unify all under Heaven", which was, in fact, representative of his desire to control and expand Chinese territory to act as an actual geographic entity. At this time there existed many feudal states that had shared cultural and economic interests, so the concept of a great nation centered on the Yellow River Plain (the known world) gradually expanded and the equivalence of tianxia with the Chinese nation evolved due to the feudal practice of conferring land.

=== Sasanian Empire ===
In the Sasanian Empire, the use of the mythological Kayanian title of kay, first used by Yazdegerd II and reaching its zenith under Peroz I, stemmed from a shift in the political perspective of the Sasanian Empire. Originally disposed towards the west against their rivals from the Byzantine Empire, this now changed to the east against the Hephthalites. The war against the Hunnic tribes (Iranian Huns) may have awakened the mythical rivalry existing between the Iranian Kayanian rulers (mythical kings of the legendary Avestan dynasty) and their Turanian enemies, which is demonstrated in the Younger Avesta. The Sasanian Shahanshah may have believed themselves the heirs of the Fereydun and Iraj (reinforced because they were Ahura Mazda's worshippers), and so possibly considered both the Byzantine domains in the west and the eastern domains of the Hephthalites as belonging to Iran, and therefore have been symbolically asserting their rights over these lands of both hemispheres of Earth by assuming the title kay. This is based on the legend of the Iranian hero-king Fereydun (Frēdōn in Middle Persian), who divided his kingdom between his three sons: his eldest son Salm received the empire of the west, 'Rûm' (more generally meaning the Roman Empire, the Greco-Roman world, or just 'the West'); the second eldest Tur received the empire of the east, being Turān (all the lands north and east of the Amu Darya, as far as China); and the youngest, Iraj, received the heartland of the empire, Iran.

=== Caliphate ===
The theme of world domination is absent in the earliest Islamic sources, Quran or the hadith. Most warlike passages in Quran appear in defensive context. The motif of world domination appears almost a century after Muhammad during the early Muslim conquests. Then Islamic thought divided the world into Dar al-Islam coterminous with the Caliphate and the rest of the world called Dar al-Harb (lit. region of war). The latter world has not yet been subjugated and its inhabitants have remained outside the Islamic frontier. Dar al-Islam and Dar al-Harb were considered in a state of war because the ultimate objective of the Caliphate was world conquest. Imperial and expansionist, the Caliphate strived to subjugate other peoples by the means of jihad. This became the chief preoccupation of the contemporary Islamic jurists, such as Al-Shaybani. The jurists elaborated jihad for the conquest of Dar al-Harb.

=== Genghis Khan ===
Genghis Khan believed that it was his destiny to conquer the world for his god, Tengri, in a mission to bring the rest of the world under one sword. This was based on his shamanic beliefs of the Great Blue Sky that spans the world, deriving his mandate for a world empire from this universal divinity. He came close to bringing the entirety of Eurasia under the Mongol Empire and the shamanic umbrella. Born Temujin, he adopted the name 'Genghis Khan', which means 'universal ruler'. This led to his sons and grandsons taking up the challenge of world conquest.

=== Ottomans ===
The Ottoman Empire had claims of world domination through the Ottoman Caliphate. Süleyman the Magnificent's Venetian Helmet was an elaborate headpiece designed to project the sultan's power in the context of Ottoman–Habsburg rivalry. The four floors of the Crown also represent Suleiman's goal of world conquest by reigning in the north, south, east and west, as well pipping the Pope's famous triple crown. Suleiman's rival, Charles V, was crowned Holy Roman Emperor by Pope Clement VII, who wore the triple crown.

=== Modern theory ===
In the early 17th century, Sir Walter Raleigh proposed that world domination could be achieved through control of the oceans, writing that "whosoever commands the sea commands the trade; whosoever commands the trade of the world commands the riches of the world, and consequently the world itself." In 1919, Halford Mackinder offered another influential theory for a route to world domination, writing:

Who rules East Europe commands the Heartland:
Who rules the Heartland commands the World-Island:
Who rules the World-Island commands the World.

While Mackinder's 'Heartland Theory' initially received little attention outside geography, it later exercised some influence on the foreign policies of world powers seeking to obtain the control suggested by the theory. Impressed with the swift opening of World War II, Derwent Whittlesey wrote in 1942:

The swift march of conquest stunned or dazzled the onlookers… The grandiose concept of the world domination became possible as a practical objective only with the rise of science and its application to mechanical invention. By these means the earth's scattered land units and territories became accessible and complementary to each other, and for the first time the world state, so long a futile medieval ideal, became a goal that might conceivably be reached.

Yet before the entry of the United States into this War and with Isolationism still intact, U.S. strategist Hanson W. Baldwin had projected that "tomorrow air bases may be the highroad to power and domination… Obviously it is only by air bases … that power exercised in the sovereign skies above a nation can be stretched far beyond its shores… Perhaps … future acquisitions of air bases … can carry the voice of America through the skies to the ends of the earth.

Writing in 1948, Hans Morgenthau stressed that the mechanical development of weapons, transportation, and communication makes "the conquest of the world technically possible, and they make it technically possible to keep the world in that conquered state." He argues that a lack of such infrastructure explains why great ancient empires, though vast, failed to complete the universal conquest of their world and perpetuate the conquest. "Today no technological obstacle stands in the way of a world-wide empire [as] modern technology makes it possible to extend the control of mind and action to every corner of the globe regardless of geography and season." Morgenthau continued on technological progress:

It has also given total war that terrifying, world-embracing impetus which seems to be satisfied with nothing less than world dominion… The machine age begets its own triumphs, each forward step calling forth two or more on the road of technological progress. It also begets its own victories, military and political; for with the ability to conquer the world and keep it conquered, it creates the will to conquer it.

However, it has been said that with the full size and scope of the world known, "world domination is an impossible goal", and specifically that "no single nation however big and powerful can dominate a world" of well over a hundred interdependent nations and billions of people.

The above assumption is challenged by scholars of the metric approach to history. Cesare Marchetti and Jesse H. Ausubel argued that the size of empires corresponds to two weeks of travel from the capital to the rim using the fastest transportation system available. The airplane permits global empire because any place can be reached within less than two weeks, though for political reasons we may have to wait a couple more generations (from 2013) to see a global empire. Max Ostrovsky stressed that the implication is even more drastic in the progress of communication. The speed of communication in the Inca Empire, for example, was 20 km per hour (running man). Today, information moves at the speed of light. By most cautious extrapolations, he concluded, modern technology allows for an empire exceeding the size or population of Earth multiple times. As US Secretary of Defense, Dick Cheney, estimated, “if we were a true empire, we would currently preside over a much greater piece of the earth’s surface than we do.”

In certain religions, some adherents may also seek the conversion (peaceful or forced) of as many people as possible to their own religion, without restrictions of national or ethnic origin. This type of spiritual domination is usually seen as distinct from the temporal dominion, although there have been instances of efforts begun as holy wars descending into the pursuit of wealth, resources, and territory. Some Christian sects teach that a false religion, led by false prophets who achieve world domination by inducing nearly universal worship of a false deity, is a prerequisite to the end times described in the Book of Revelation. As one author put it, "if world domination is to be obtained, the masses of little people must be brought on board with religion."

In some instances, speakers have accused nations or ideological groups of seeking world domination, even where those entities have denied that this was their goal. For example, J. G. Ballard quoted Aldous Huxley as having said of the United States entering the First World War, "I dread the inevitable acceleration of American world domination which will be the result of it all… Europe will no longer be Europe." In 2012, a politician and critic of Islam, Geert Wilders, characterized Islam as "an ideology aiming for world domination rather than a religion," and in 2008 characterized the Israel–Gaza conflict as a proxy action by Islam against the West, contending that "the end of Israel would not mean the end of our problems with Islam, but only … the start of the final battle for world domination".

== See also ==
- World revolution
- American imperialism
- Russian imperialism
- Chinese expansionism
- Global governance, the political interaction of transnational actors.
- New Order (Nazism)
- List of largest empires by maximum extent of land area occupied.
- Singleton (global governance), a hypothetical world order in which there is a single decision-making agency (potentially an advanced artificial intelligence) at the highest level, capable of exerting effective control over its domain.
- Superpower, a state with a leading position in the international system and the ability to influence events in its own interest by global projection of power.
- King of the Universe
- Universal monarchy
