= Mokhtarian =

Mokhtarian is an Armenian surname. Notable people with the surname include:

- Ashkan Mokhtarian (born 1985), Iranian-born Australian mixed martial artist
- Patricia Mokhtarian, American civil engineer and transport economist
