= Schedule delay =

In transport modelling, schedule delay is the difference between a desired time of arrival or departure and the actual time. Despite the use of "delay", it can be a difference in either the early or late direction.

The most common example is that of having a fixed work start time: if someone starts work at 0900 but actually arrives at 0850, they are incurring a schedule delay of 10 minutes. Alternative examples might include public transport - if a bus is scheduled to depart from a stop at 20-minute intervals (e.g. 0800, 0820, 0840) and a person wishes to begin their journey between those intervals (e.g. at 0815), they incur a schedule delay through having to retime their departure from the desired 0815 point to the bus departure time of 0820.

Schedule delay can be measured as a utility (or, rather, a disutility). The Small model of scheduling has the disutility of schedule delay decrease linearly towards zero as the actual arrival (or departure) time approaches the desired time. The disutility of schedule delay for a late arrival or departure also increase linearly, but Small hypothesises that there can also be a fixed penalty component of schedule delay on the "late" side - e.g. arriving late for work is always bad, even if it is only slightly late.

== See also ==
- Transportation planning
- Mohring effect
