= Herbert Mohring =

- Born: 1928; Buffalo, New York
- Died: June 4, 2012 (aged 83); Northfield, Minnesota

Academic background
- Education: Massachusetts Institute of Technology
- Influences: Robert Solow

Academic work
- Discipline: Transportation economics
- Institutions: University of Minnesota
- Notable ideas: Mohring effect

Herbert Mohring (1928 – June 4, 2012) was a transportation economist who taught at the University of Minnesota from 1961–1994. He received his Ph.D. from Massachusetts Institute of Technology in 1959, with a thesis on the life insurance industry supervised by Robert Solow.

He is widely known for his identification of what was dubbed the Mohring effect of increasing returns in public transportation (see: Mohring (1972) for details).

Mohring and Harwitz (1962) also showed that the revenues from the first-best congestion tax exactly cover the capacity costs (which include depreciation and capital costs, but not investment costs) of highways when highways possess constant returns to scale.

== Selected works ==
- Mohring, Herbert, Optimization and Scale Economies in Urban Bus Transportation, American Economic Review 62, no. 4 (September 1972): 591-604.
- Mohring, Herbert, The Peak Load Problem with Increasing Returns and Pricing Constraints, American Economic Review 60, no. 4 (September 1970): 693-705.
- Mohring, H. and Harwitz, M., Highway Benefits: An Analytical Framework, Ch 2, pp 57–90. (1962)
