= Martin J. H. Mogridge =

English transport analyst (1940–2000)

Martin Mogridge
- Born: 2 December 1940; Welwyn Garden City, United Kingdom
- Died: 29 February 2000 (aged 59); London, England

Philosophical work
- Main interests: Traffic analysis; Transport; City planning

Martin Mogridge (December 2, 1940 – February 29, 2000) was a British transport researcher based in London. He proposed the Lewis–Mogridge position that traffic varies in relation to the potential avenues of travel available, thus arguing that adding new roads to a transport network was potentially counter productive (see Braess's paradox) if a wider knowledge of local transport routes was not applied.

== Works ==
- Estimation of Regional and Sub-regional Household Income Distributions and Their Use in Demand Forecasting, 1972
- Travel in Towns: Jam Yesterday, Jam Today and Jam Tomorrow, 1990
- Metropolis Or Region, 1994
- The Rejuvenation of Inner London, 1996
- The self-defeating nature of urban road capacity policy, 1997
