= Generalised cost =

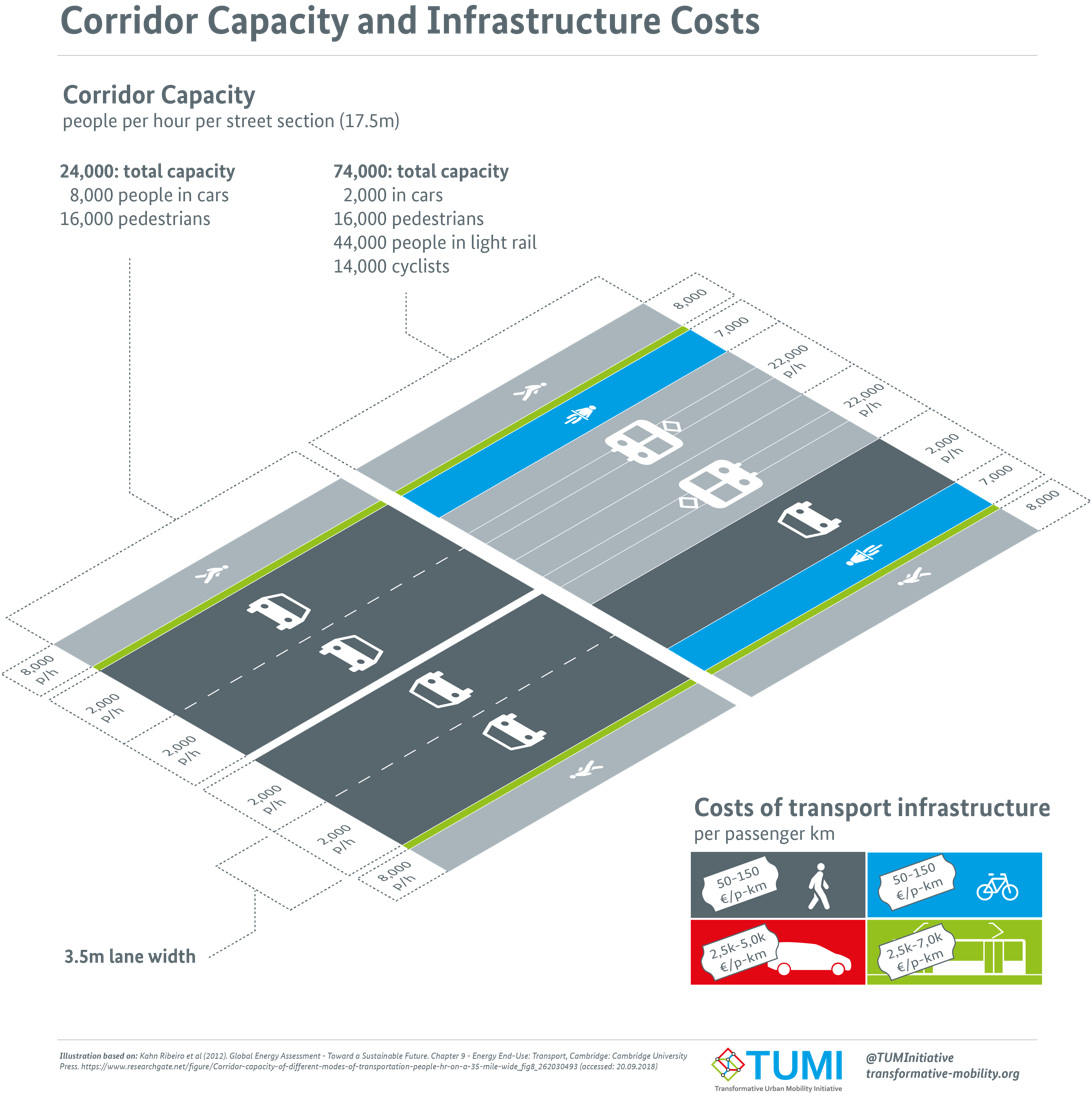
Illustration of motorists, pedestrians, light rail and cyclists with corridor capacity (people per hour per street section) and transport infrastructure costs per passenger kilometer

In transport economics, the generalised cost is the sum of the monetary and non-monetary costs of a journey. It is sometimes used as a basis for judgements of transit accessibility and equitable distribution of public transit resources.

Monetary (or "out-of-pocket") costs might include a fare on a public transport journey, or the costs of fuel, wear and tear and any parking charge, toll or congestion charge on a car journey.

Non-monetary costs refer to the time spent undertaking the journey. Time is converted to a money value using a value of time figure, which usually varies according to the traveller's income and the purpose of the trip.

The generalised cost is equivalent to the price of the good in supply and demand theory, and so demand for journeys can be related to the generalised cost of those journeys using the price elasticity of demand. Supply is equivalent to capacity (and, for roads, road quality) on the network.

== Basic form ==
In a basic form, the generalised cost (g) is composed of the following:

$g=p+u(w)$

- p refers to the monetary (out-of-pocket) costs of the journey.
- u(w) refers to the non-monetary (time) costs of an uncongested journey. This is a function of w (in the transport economic model, w is a measure of road standard or public transport service level, both of which are related to capacity). When the free-flow journey time is known, u(w) can be calculated as the product of the journey time (t) in uncongested conditions and the opportunity cost of the traveller's time (τ), so that $u(w) = \tau t$.

== Congestible networks ==
In a congestible system, every traveller imposes a small delay on every other traveller, increasing the journey time for all travellers. The generalised cost function can be expanded to reflect this congestion delay.

$g=p+u(w)+v(q,w)$

The additional term v(q,w) refers to the opportunity cost of the additional journey time a traveller experiences because of congestion. In transport economic models, the parameter q is the demand and w is a measure of capacity (which is relevant when considering possible capacity expansion).

For example, if the travel time on a particular stretch of road increases by 10 minutes for every 1000 vehicles per hour that use the road, if q were measured in thousands of vehicles per hour, we would consider the congestion function to be $v = 2q$.

== Weighting different types of time ==
It has been observed that travellers prefer time spent on some parts of their journey over time spent on others. A typical journey can be divided into four parts:

- Walk from the origin
- Wait for the vehicle
- Ride in the vehicle
- Walk to the destination

(All of these apply to public transport journeys; the wait for the vehicle does not generally apply to car or bicycle journeys, and for walk-only journeys, there is no division into parts.)

Typically, although travellers "dislike" all time spent travelling, they dislike walking and waiting parts of the journey more than in-vehicle journey time, and thus would be willing to pay more to avoid them. This results in a higher value of time for those parts of the journey than the main in-vehicle part of the journey. The function u(w) mentioned earlier can therefore be considered to consist of differing sets of valued time.

An alternative approach to applying different values of time to each part of the journey is to apply a weighting to time spent on each different part of the journey which quantifies the level of dislike a traveller has for time spent on that bit of the journey relative to time spent in-vehicle. For example, if a traveller considers 10 minutes' walk to be "as bad" as 12 minutes in a vehicle, then each minute of walking time is equivalent to 1.2 minutes of in-vehicle time. In this manner, all parts of the journey can be converted into their equivalent in-vehicle time.

Journey planners, such as OpenTripPlanner, use this concept to weigh results, which can be configured by the user to suit his/her preferences.

Once the equivalent in-vehicle time for the whole journey is calculated, this can be converted to a monetary value as described earlier.

== Generalised time ==
If the monetary cost of the journey (p) is considered to be irrelevant for the purposes of the exercise (for example, when comparing different journey options through a public transport network when fares are constant), there is no need to convert the generalised cost to a currency value - instead, it can be left in units of time, as long as all time is equivalent (for example, if all time is converted to in-vehicle time). These units of time may be referred to as generalised time.
