= Value of time =

Type of opportunity cost in transport economics

The time that one spends travelling can't be spent on studying or working; in that sense, time is money. Geographer Andy Nelson (University of Twente) created a map to calculate how much time is wasted.

In transport economics, the value of time is the opportunity cost of the time that a traveler spends on their journey. In essence, this makes it the amount that a traveler would be willing to pay in order to save time, or the amount they would accept as compensation for lost time.

One of the main justifications for transport improvements is the amount of time that travelers will save. Using a set of values of time, the economic benefits of a transport project can be quantified in order to compare them to the costs (thus forming the basis of cost-benefit analysis). In particular, savings (or, for that matter, increases) in travel time form part of the change in consumer surplus for a transport project.

== Calculating the value of time ==
Values of time are used to calculate the non-monetary costs incurred as part of a journey, so that the generalized cost of the journey (a combination of both monetary and non-monetary costs) can be calculated.

The value of time varies considerably from person to person and depends upon the purpose of the journey, but it can generally be divided into two sets of valuations: working time and non-working time. This division is appropriate because the value of working time (i.e., time spent traveling in the course of work) is calculated differently from the value of non-working time (i.e., time spent traveling outside work).

For example, if a worker on a salary of £20 per hour travels to a meeting, the value of time in that case is £20 per hour, because that is the amount the employer would be willing to pay to reduce travel time (as travel time can be considered to be "wasted", i.e., not spent working).

In practice, time spent traveling on certain modes (especially train, but also bus and car passengers) can sometimes be used to carry out some work, while time spent using certain other modes (especially car drivers, cyclists, and walkers) cannot be used to carry out work. Thus, the value of travel time (and thus the value of travel time reductions) for modes where the employee could carry on doing some work is lower for employees already using any such mode. Conversely, the value of travel time reductions for such modes for employees currently using a mode that does not allow carry out work (and who would switch mode) is larger.

The UK Department for Transport calculates average values of time for travel on various modes of transport so that these values can be used to appraise transport projects as part of its New Approach to Appraisal. Some examples are given below in 2002 prices:

- Car drivers: £26.43 per hour
- Car passengers: £18.94 per hour
- Bus passengers: £20.22 per hour
- Rail passengers: £36.96 per hour*
- Underground passengers: £35.95 per hour*
- Walkers: £29.64 per hour
- Cyclists: £17.00 per hour

∗ Skewed by London wages

The US Department for Transport uses the average value of time for infrastructure projects at 50% of the wage rate. Recent experimental research across the US suggests that this value should be 75%.

== Non-working time ==
This is time spent outside our work, which might include journeys to and from work and leisure journeys. Since this time is not valued in a market, it can only be estimated from revealed preference or stated preference analysis techniques, where the real or hypothetical choices of travelers between faster, more expensive modes and slower, cheaper modes can be examined.

For example, if a traveler has a choice between a coach which takes six hours and costs £10, or a train which takes four hours and costs £30, we can deduce that if the traveler chooses the train, their value of time is £10 per hour or more (because they are willing to spend at least £20 to save two hours' travel time).

The difficulty in narrowing down the actual value of time from a pair of choices means that hypothetical situations are generally used (the stated preference technique) to deduce values of time.

The value of non-working time is linked strongly to utility theory.

== Forecasting the value of time ==
The value of time cannot be assumed constant over time. Time is a limited good and as productivity and income increase, the relative value of time increases as well. Historically, the projection of the value of time has been closely linked to personal income growth, which in practical applications is typically approximated by GDP growth. Due to a substantial amount of uncertainty in predicting the relationship between income and the value of time, it is common to apply relatively simple “rule-of-thumb” estimates that are measured as elasticity to income.

Generally, it is not clear what the elasticity should be, and from a theoretical standpoint there is no reason why the income elasticity for private travel should be unity, since it is a matter of personal preference how individuals or households allocate additional income to purchasing time savings.

== See also ==
- Time geography
