= Dietrich Braess =

German mathematician (born 1938)

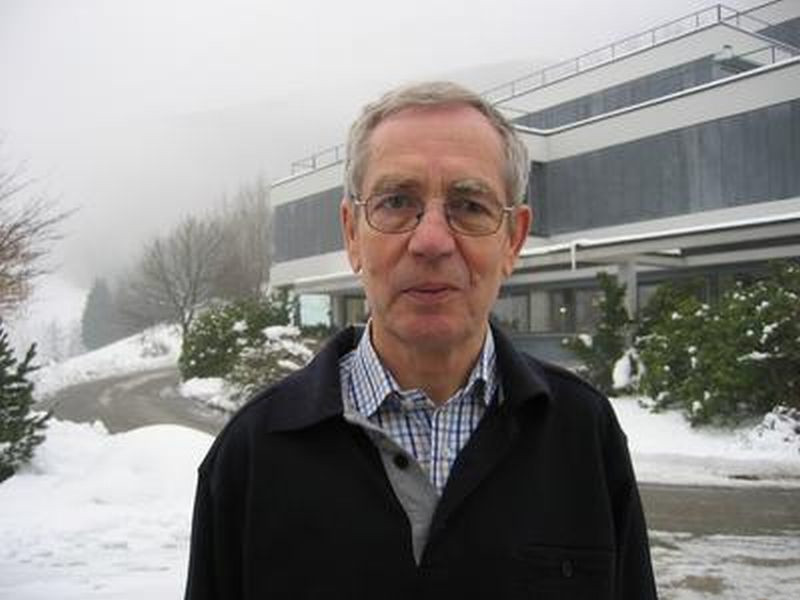
- Braess at Oberwolfach, 2005
- Born: 16 June 1938 (age 88); Hamburg
- Education: University of Hamburg (PhD); University of Münster (Hab)
- Known for: Braess's paradox
- Scientific career
- Fields: Mathematics
- Workplaces: Ruhr University Bochum
- Doctoral advisor: Gustav Kramer

Dietrich Braess (born 16 June 1938) is a German mathematician. He is known for Braess's paradox, which deals with traffic equilibrium. Braess's focus has centered on numerical treatment of elliptical differential equations and nonlinear approximation theories.
