= Marchetti's constant =

Average commuting time

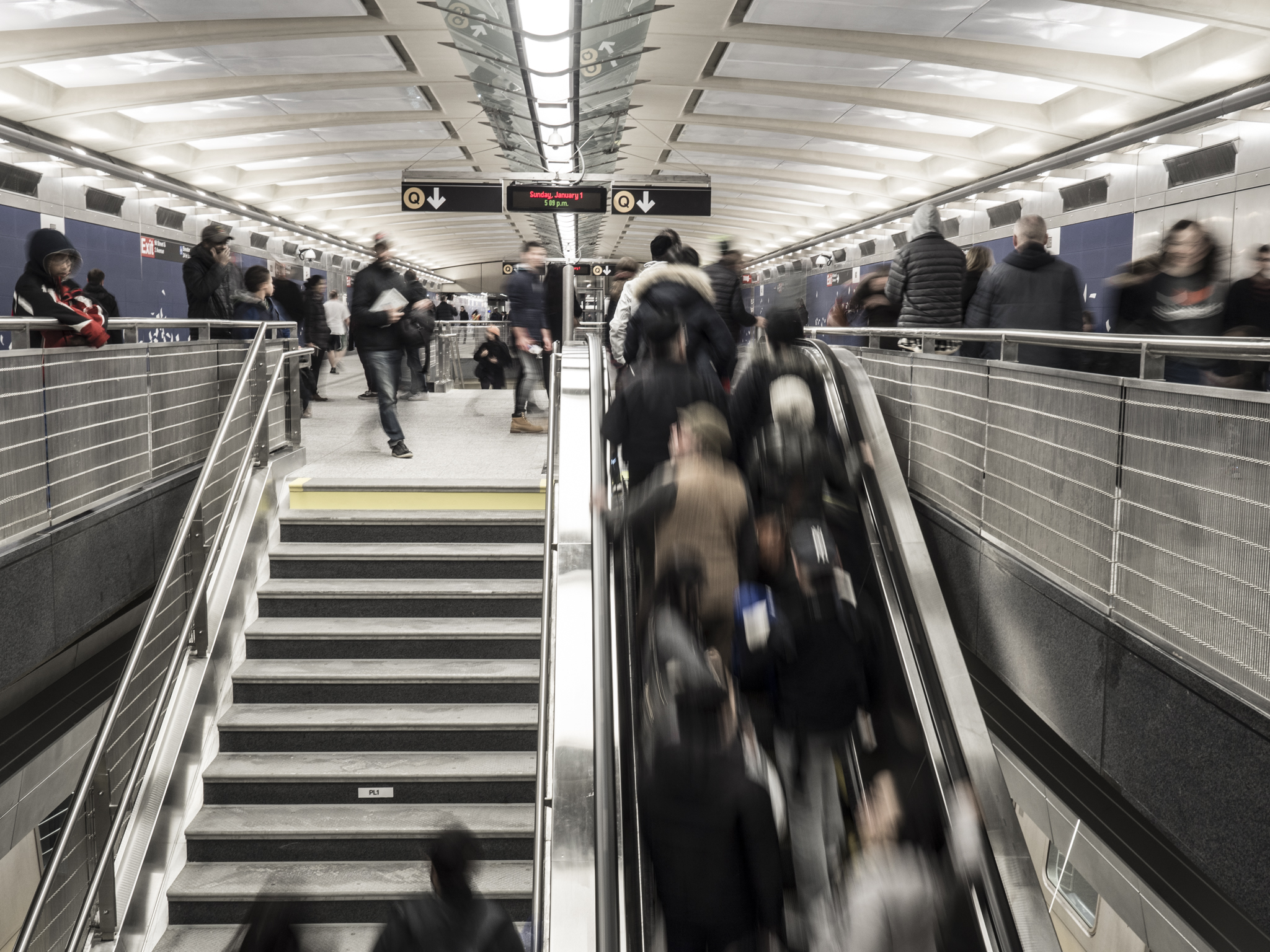
Commuters on the New York City Subway

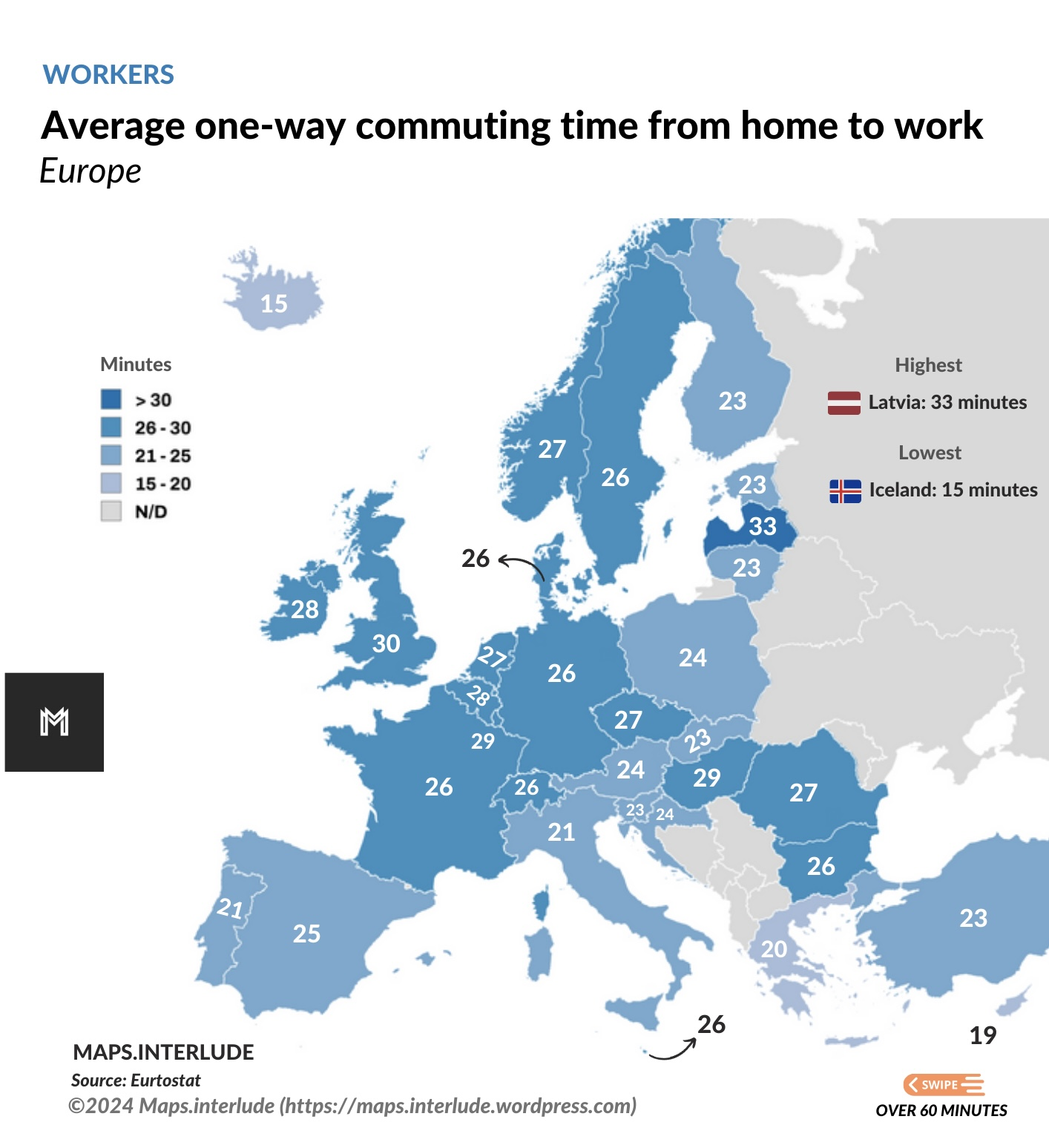
Average commuting time to work in Europe, in 2024

Marchetti's constant is the average time spent by a person for commuting each day. Its value is approximately one hour, or half an hour for a one-way trip. It is named after Italian physicist Cesare Marchetti, though Marchetti himself attributed the "one hour" finding to transportation analyst and engineer Yacov Zahavi.

Marchetti posits that although forms of urban planning and transport may change, and although some live in villages and others in cities, people gradually adjust their lives to their conditions (including location of their homes relative to their workplace) such that the average travel time stays approximately constant. In his 1934 book Technics and Civilization, Lewis Mumford attributes this observation to Bertrand Russell:

Mr. Bertrand Russell has noted that each improvement in locomotion has increased the area over which people are compelled to move: so that a person who would have had to spend half an hour to walk to work a century ago must still spend half an hour to reach his destination, because the contrivance that would have enabled him to save time had he remained in his original situation now—by driving him to a more distant residential area—effectually cancels out the gain.

A related concept is that of Zahavi, who also noticed that people seem to have a constant "travel time budget", that is, "a stable daily amount of time that people make available for travel." David Metz, former chief scientist at the Department for Transport, UK, cites data of average travel time in Britain drawn from the British National Travel Survey in support of Marchetti's and Zahavi's conclusions. The work casts doubt on the contention that investment in infrastructure saves travel time. Instead, it appears from Metz's figures that people invest travel time saved in travelling a longer distance, a particular example of Jevons paradox described by the Lewis–Mogridge position. Because of the constancy of travel times as well as induced travel, Robert Cervero have argued that the World Bank and other international aid agencies evaluate transportation investment proposals in developing and rapidly motorizing cities less on the basis of potential travel-time savings and more on the accessibility benefits they confer.

== See also ==
- Braess's paradox – Paradox related to increasing roadway capacity
- Urban sprawl – Expansion of auto-oriented, low-density development in suburbs
- 15-minute city – Urban accessibility concept
