= Cesare Marchetti =

Italian physicist (1927–2023)

Cesare Marchetti (1927 – 16 April 2023) was an Italian physicist. He is best known as the inventor of Marchetti's constant, the idea that people are willing to commute half-an-hour each way. He also conceived of using carbon capture and storage to reduce greenhouse gas emissions.
