= Mohring effect =

The Mohring effect is the observation that, if the frequency of a transit service (e.g., buses per hour) increases with demand, then a rise in demand shortens the waiting time of passengers at stops and stations. Because waiting time forms part of the costs of transportation, the Mohring effect implies increasing returns to scale for scheduled urban transport services.

The effect was named for the University of Minnesota economist Herbert Mohring, who identified this property in a 1972 paper.

== Example ==
For example, suppose that passengers arrive randomly at a bus stop over the course of an hour, while the bus arrives once per hour. The average waiting time is 30 minutes. If the number of passengers per hour increases sufficiently to justify two buses per hour, then the average waiting time falls to 15 minutes. The presence of additional users lowers the cost of existing passengers. This anti-congestion effect is opposite to the usual road congestion effect, where an increase in the number of users decreases the speed and the quality of service of the other users.

== Transit subsidies ==
The Mohring effect is often referenced in support of transit subsidies, on the grounds that subsidy is required to achieve marginal cost pricing when the Mohring effect is relevant. The average cost of a passenger-journey includes the average waiting time, while the marginal cost includes only the average waiting time less the diminution in total waiting time caused by the increase in frequency. Average cost thus exceeds marginal cost, and a subsidy that bridges the gap is said to improve welfare.

== See also ==
- Positive externality
- Network effect
