= Patricia Mokhtarian =

American civil engineer

Patricia Lyon Mokhtarian is an American civil engineer and transport economist, the Clifford and William Greene, Jr. Professor of Civil and Environmental Engineering at Georgia Tech, and professor emerita of civil and environmental engineering at the University of California, Davis. Her research focuses on travel behavior, and the effects of land use and telecommuting on personal travel choices.

== Education and career ==
Mokhtarian completed a Ph.D. in 1981 at Northwestern University. Her dissertation, Time-Dependent Structural Equations Modeling of the Relationship between Attitudes and Discrete Choice Behavior of Transportation Consumers, was supervised by Frank Koppelman.

She was a regional planner and consultant in Southern California before taking a faculty position at the University of California, Davis in 1990. In 2013 she retired as professor emerita, and moved to Georgia Tech. She was the Susan G. and Christopher D. Pappas Professor at Georgia Tech for five years, beginning in 2016, before being named as the Clifford and William Greene, Jr. Professor in 2021.

== Recognition ==
In 2021, the International Association for Travel Behaviour Research gave Mokhtarian their Lifetime Achievement Award. Mokhtarian was elected to the National Academy of Engineering in 2024, "for improved transportation systems planning and practice through quantifying human behavior".
