= Jan Beenakker =

Dutch physicist and rector (1926–1998)

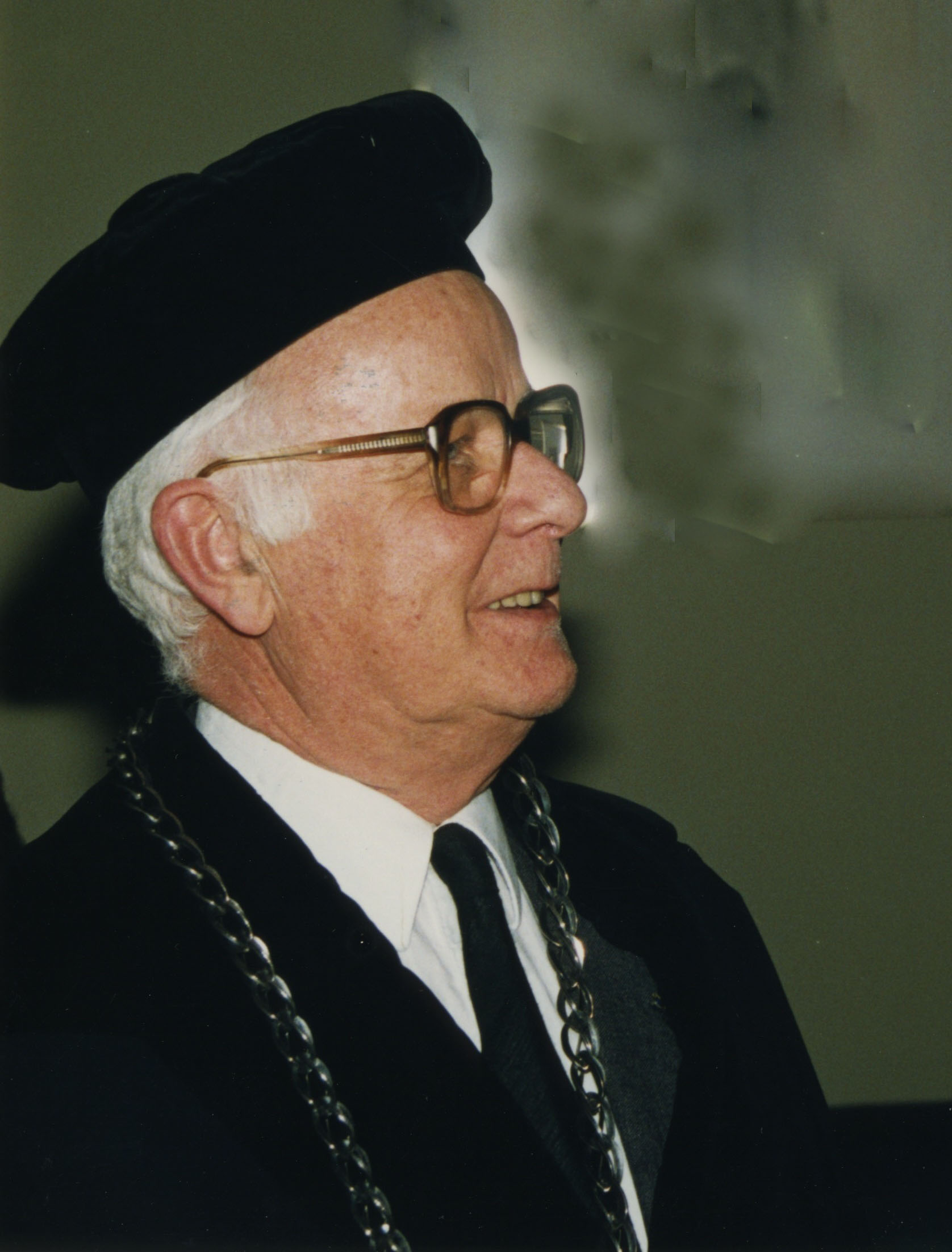
- Born: February 1, 1926; Koog aan de Zaan, The Netherlands
- Died: July 23, 1998 (aged 72); Leiden, The Netherlands
- Education: Leiden University
- Children: Carlo Beenakker
- Scientific career
- Workplaces: Leiden University
- Thesis: De invloed van het heliumisotoop met massa 3 op de eigenschappen van vloeibaar helium II (1954)
- Doctoral advisor: Cornelis Jacobus Gorter; Krijn Wybren Taconis
- Doctoral students: Eric Mazur
- Other notable students: Giacinto Scoles (research scientist)

Joannes Joseph Maria Beenakker (February 1, 1926, in Koog aan de Zaan – July 23, 1998, in Leiden), more often known as Jan J. M. Beenakker or Jan Beenakker, was a Dutch physicist and the rector of the Leiden University.

== Education and career ==
Beenakker was the son of a railway employee and grew up in Zeeland and Rotterdam. In 1942 he obtained his Abitur, but because of the Second World War he was only able to start studying physics at Leiden University in 1945. In 1951, after intermittent military service, he received his diploma in meteorology and in 1954 he received his doctorate in low temperature physics from Cornelis Jacobus Gorter and Krijn Wybren Taconis from the Kamerlingh-Onnes Laboratory at Leiden University. His dissertation was on the influence of the helium-3 isotope on superconductivity. Beenakker remained in Leiden after graduation, where he became a lecturer in 1959 and a full professor of experimental physics in 1963. From 1985 until his retirement in 1991 he was rector magnificus of the Leiden University. Between 1969 and 1970, Beenakker was on sabbatical at the Massachusetts Institute of Technology. Between 1961 and 1962 visiting professor at the KU Leuven.

== Research ==
His research dealt with the thermodynamic and transport properties of liquids and gases. The Senftleben-Beenakker effects are named after him and the German physicist Hermann Senftleben, which describe the influence of electric and magnetic fields on the transport properties (thermal conductivity, viscosity) of molecular gases. It bears a distant resemblance to the Hall effect in solids. From earlier experiments by Senftleben it was believed that this only affected paramagnetic molecules such as nitric oxide and oxygen, but Beenakker and his colleague Hein Knaap showed that diamagnetic gases such as nitrogen and methane are also affected by external fields (but they should have a non-spherical shape have), since the precession rate between two collisions of the molecules is changed by them.

Beenakker also studied transport in highly diluted gases, in which boundary layer phenomena play a role and new phenomena emerge (viscomagnetic heat flow, thermomagnetic pressure difference). With colleagues, he was the first to observe the non-equilibrium velocity distribution in a heat-conducting gas.

== Honors and awards ==
He was chairman of the Stichting voor Fundamenteel Onderzoek der Matter (FOM), a Dutch research foundation for basic research. He became a member of the Royal Netherlands Academy of Arts and Sciences in 1978. He received an honorary doctorate from the University of Waterloo, became a Knight of the Order of the Netherlands Lion and an officer in the Belgian Order of the Crown.

== Personal life ==
Beenakker was married to Elena Manaresi (1927 – 2009) and had three sons from the marriage, Carlo Beenakker, Jan Willem Beenakker, and Peter Beenakker.

== Bibliography ==
- De invloed van het heliumisotoop met massa 3 op de eigenschappen van vloeibaar helium II. Leiden 1954 (PDF).
- De intermoleculaire krachten en de transportverschijnselen in verdunde gassen. Leiden 1960 (PDF).
- Communicatie in de natuurkunde. Leiden 1963
- Gassen met roterende moleculen. Leiden 1988
- Geleerden en hun leerlingen. Leiden 1991
- McCourt, Frederick R. W.; Jan J. M., Beenakker; Köhler, Walter E.; Kuscer, Ivan (1990). Nonequilibrium phenomena in polyatomic gases: Volume 1: Dilute Gases. Oxford: Clarendon Press. ISBN 0-19-855631-4. OCLC 20491475.
- McCourt, Frederick R. W.; Jan J. M., Beenakker; Köhler, Walter E.; Kuscer, Ivan (1999). Nonequilibrium phenomena in polyatomic gases: Volume 2: Cross-sections, Scattering, and Rarefied Gases. Oxford: Clarendon Press. ISBN 0-19-855648-9. OCLC 20491475.
