= Anatole Leduc =

French physicist (1856–1937)

Anatole Sylvester Leduc (22 April 1856 – 16 April 1937) was a French physicist and a professor at the Faculty of Science in Paris. He was one of the independent discoverers of the thermal Hall effect.

Leduc was born in Oust-Marais (Somme) to farmer Ferdinand and his wife Marie Madeleine Augustin Lottin. He studied at the Douai high school and at Abbeville college before entering the Ecole Polytechnique and the Ecole Normale Supérieure (1876). He graduated in mathematics and physics (1878) and received a doctorate in 1888. He taught at Stanislas College from 1880 and from 1883 at the Lycee Saint-Louis. In 1892 he became a lecturer at the Faculty of Sciences and in 1900 he became an assistant professor. In 1921 he was a professor without chair and in 1922 he became a full professor of theoretical and celestial physics. He was knighted on his retirement in 1926 and made Knight of the Legion of Honor.

Leduc's most famous work was the discovery of a difference in temperature produced by a magnetic field on a metal strip. At the same time, it was also noted by Augusto Righi in Italy and the effect is sometimes called the Righi–Leduc effect.

He married Hélène Jenny Dutilleul in 1867 and they had four children. Leduc died at Chatenay-Malabry in 1937.
