= Conceptual question =

Conceptual questions or conceptual problems in science, technology, engineering, and mathematics (STEM) education are questions that can be answered based only on the knowledge of relevant concepts, rather than performing extensive calculations. They contrast with most homework and exam problems in science and engineering that typically require plugging in numerical values into previously discussed formulas. Such "plug-and-chug" numerical problems can often be solved correctly by just matching the pattern of the problem to a previously discussed problem and changing the numerical inputs, which requires significant amounts of time to perform the calculations but does not test or deepen the understanding of how the concepts and formulas should work together. Conceptual questions, therefore, provide a good complement to conventional numerical problems because they need minimal or no calculations and instead encourage the students to engage more deeply with the underlying concepts and how they relate to formulas.

Conceptual problems are often formulated as multiple-choice questions, making them easy to use during in-class discussions, particularly when utilizing active learning, peer instruction, and audience response. An example of a conceptual question in undergraduate thermodynamics is provided below:

During adiabatic expansion of an ideal gas, its temperature

1. increases
2. decreases
3. stays the same
4. Impossible to tell/need more information

The use of conceptual questions in physics was popularized by Eric Mazur, particularly in the form of multiple-choice tests that he called ConcepTests. In recent years, multiple websites that maintain lists of conceptual questions have been created by instructors for various disciplines. Some books on physics provide many examples of conceptual questions as well.

Multiple conceptual questions can be assembled into a concept inventory to test the working knowledge of students at the beginning of a course or to track the improvement in conceptual understanding throughout the course.
