= Giacinto Scoles =

Italian-American molecular physicist (1935–2024)

- Born: 2 April 1935; Turin, Italy
- Died: 25 September 2024 (aged 89); Sassenheim, Netherlands
- Education: University of Genoa
- Scientific career
- Institutions: Leiden University; University of Genoa; University of Waterloo; Princeton University; International School for Advanced Studies; Elettra Sincrotrone Trieste; Temple University
- Academic advisors: Jan Beenakker
- Doctoral students: Brooks Pate

Giacinto Scoles FRS (2 April 1935 – 24 September 2024) was an Italian-American chemist and physicist. He is known for developing molecular beam methods for the study of weak van der Waals forces between atoms, molecules, and surfaces. He developed the cryogenic bolometer as a universal detector of atomic and molecule beams thatcan detect a small flux of molecules and respond to their internal energy. This is the basis for the optothermal spectroscopy technique which Scoles and others have used to obtain very high signal-to noise and high resolution ro-vibrational spectra.

== Life and career ==
Giacinto Scoles was born in Turin, Italy, and was raised there throughout the Second World War. A few years after the war, he moved with his family to Spain, where Scoles spent his adolescence. He returned to Italy and graduated from the University of Genoa in 1959 with a degree in chemistry. His first publication was "Vapour Pressure of Isotopic Liquids I" published 1959 in Il Nuovo Cimento. Starting his interdisciplinary research between chemistry and physics, in 1960 he was appointed Assistant Professorship in the Physics Department of the University of Genoa where he taught a lab course and conducted experiments on isotope separation during physical adsorption (physisorption).

In 1961, Scoles changed his research area and joined Jan Beenakker's group at the Kamerlingh-Onnes Laboratorium of Leiden University in the Netherlands. There he co-authored one of the first papers on what became soon known as the Senftleben-Beenakker effect: the influence of an external magnetic or electric field on the transport properties of dilute polyatomic gases. The idea behind this effect is that every polyatomic molecule – even a simple paramagnetic one like N_{2} – has a magnetic moment, due to its end-over-end rotation, which can be used as a handle to make it precess in an external magnetic field. If the precession frequency is sufficiently large compared to the collision frequency, the average kinetic cross section will change, and so will the transport properties. Likewise, for polar molecules one may employ electric fields to achieve the desired precession. This contributed to understanding of the non-spherical part (i.e. the angle dependence) of the intermolecular potential. In addition, several new phenomena were later discovered that had been believed to be non-existing in neutral gases, like transverse transport effects in a magnetic field, comparable to the Hall effect in electrical conduction.

In 1964, Scoles returned to the University of Genoa as Assistant Professor of Physics. He stayed in Genoa until 1971 and in those years established a molecular beams laboratory devoted to the investigation of intermolecular forces in gases. Most significant was the development of the cryogenic bolometer to detect molecular beams. Bolometers detect tiny heat input (with noise on the order of 10^{−14} watts per square root hertz) and had previously been developed as detectors of Infrared Radiation but here they are used to measure the internal and translational energy of a beam of atoms or molecules. He set up the test apparatus together with M. Cavallini and G. Gallinaro. Scoles and his colleagues published a series of papers which include the determination of the energy dependence of the integral collision cross section of He scattered by He, the observation of "Rainbow Scattering" between two crossed beams of Argon, the first measurement of orbiting resonances in the scattering between two atoms (Hg and H).

In 1971, Scoles moved to the University of Waterloo in Canada as Professor of Chemistry and Physics. There, he set up the first successful crossed molecular beam laboratory in Canada. He helped establish Waterloo's Centre for Molecular Beams and Laser Chemistry, the Centre for Surface Science in Technology, as well as the weekly chemical physics seminars and annual Symposium on Chemical Physics. He was the initial Acting Director of the Guelph-Waterloo Centre for Graduate Work in Chemistry, the first inter-university graduate program in Canada. Scoles performed crossed beam differential scattering cross-section studies of atom-atom, atom-molecule and molecule-molecule interactions, using his bolometer detector. He also began using helium atom diffraction to study the structure of surfaces, both of pure crystals which often undergo change from the bulk structure (reconstruction) and also the structure of overlayers of atoms and molecules absorbed on surfaces. With Terry Gough and then graduate student Roger Miller, Scoles introduced the technique of bolometer-detected optothermal spectroscopy of molecular beams where vibrational excitation of a beam of molecules is detected by the bolometer. They used this technique to studies vibrational dissociation of a complex of two or more molecules held together by Van der Waals forces. By the early 1980s, Scoles began the first studies of the spectroscopy of molecules adsorbed in or on clusters of rare gas atoms.

In the mid-to-late 1970s Scoles spent part of his time at the University of Trento, Italy where he established a new molecular beam laboratory. The activity of the Trento lab was mainly focused on opto-thermal spectroscopy and atomic hydrogen scattering experiments.

Scoles moved to Princeton University in 1986. One of the experiments that Scoles brought to Princeton was the study of IR spectroscopy of molecules attached to inert gas clusters, particularly Ar and Xe clusters. In this work, he developed the "pickup technique" and began his work on superfluid helium nanodroplets, for which he shared the Benjamin Franklin Award in Physics. The helium experiments, started with students S. Goyal and D. Schutt, provided the first molecular spectra of solutes in liquid helium, a unique superfluid solvent. Frank Stienkemeier joined the group as a postdoc and together with graduate students John Higgins and Carlo Callegari (and sabbatical visitor Wolfgang Ernst) established the "Alkali age" of the group. Graduate student James Reho brought time resolved spectroscopy techniques into the mix. Erik Kerstel did a thesis on subdoppler spectroscopy of hydrogen bonded complexes, including the first such spectra in the vibrational overtone region. Brooks Pate brought Scoles and Kevin K. Lehmann together for what proved to be a long series of experiments (and many Ph.D. theses) that characterized Intramolecular Vibrational energy Redistribution. They first studied the hydrogen stretching fundamental and first overtone spectral regions and observed Lorentzian lineshapes due to irreversible relaxation for large molecules with a very high density of states. They developed IR-microwave and later IR-IR double resonance methods to provide unambiguous quantum assignments of even highly congested spectra and to reach higher in energy. The work by Andrea Callegari on benzene, long a model system for such studies is noted among many such studies. After this work, Carlo Callegari converted the apparatus into a helium droplet machine, which was used for the first study of overtone vibrational transitions in helium nanodroplets. Also, the pure rotational spectra of HCCCN and HCN in helium were observed. This established that a single droplet could absorb several thousand photons without "optically pumping" out of resonance.

Scoles helped establish the Princeton Materials Institute and became a close collaborator of Peter Eisenberger, its first director. Scoles also brought to Princeton his Helium Diffraction Spectrometer for the study of surface structure. His focus turned from inorganic overlayers to the study of self-assembled monolayers, particularly alkane thiols on Au(111). Scoles collaborated with Eisenberger in using X-Rays as a complementary surface structure tool and showed the power of the combination of the two methods. Scoles developed expertise in atomic force microscopy (AFM) to study surface structure and more recently, tip induced surface modification using the nanografting technique [16,17] which had been previously developed by his former student Gang Yu Liu. In collaboration with Steve Bernasek, Scoles has also studied the influence of vibrational excitation (again for the first time in the first C-H overtone region) on the sticking probability of a molecule (methane) on a metal surface.

Starting in 2003, Scoles returned part-time to Italy, taking appointments at the Trieste Synchrotron Elettra and the International School for Advanced Studies (SISSA), In SISSA he joined the Condensed Matter group where he began collaborating on theoretical problems dealing with helium nanodroplets and with physisorption. At the same time, he started an experimental group in Elettra, focusing on nanoscience, with particular attention to self-assembled monolayers and their properties [19,20]. Later, Scoles expanded his research into nanoscale biological processes, biophysics, and nanomedicine, in connection with the local Consortium of Molecular Biomedicine.

Scoles died in Sassenheim, Netherlands on 24 September 2024, at the age of 89.

== Awards and honors ==
- 2006 – Research Prize of the Chemistry Faculty of the University of Bochum
- 2006 – Benjamin Franklin Medal in Physics (with Jan Peter Toennies) from the Franklin Institute.
- 2003 – Creativity Award from the NSF 2003-5
- 2004 – Texas A&M University, Frontiers in Chemical Research Lecturer
- 2004 – Moscowitz Lecturer at the University of Minnesota, October 2004
- 2003 – Distinguished Visiting Professor, University of Florida, Gainesville.
- 2003 – Earle K. Plyler Prize for Molecular Spectroscopy from the American Physical Society (with Kevin K. Lehmann).
- 2002 – Peter Debye Award in Physical Chemistry from the American Chemical Society
- 2001 – H. E. Gunning Lecturer, Dept. of Chem., University of Alberta
- 2000 – Elected Foreign Member of The Royal Netherlands Academy of Arts and Sciences
- 2000 – Honorary Science Doctorate from the University of Waterloo
- 1999 – Samuel M. McElvain Lecturer, University of Wisconsin–Madison
- 1997 – Elected Fellow of The Royal Society (United Kingdom)
- 1996 – Recipient of an Honorary Doctorate in Physics from the University of Genoa
- 1995 – Recipient of a Senior Fellowship of the Alexander von Humboldt Foundation
- 1995 – Recipient of the 1995 Lippincott Award of the Optical Society of America, the Coblentz Society, and the Society for Applied Spectroscopy
- 1986 – Senior Killam Fellowship.

== See also ==
- List of University of Waterloo people
