= Wendy Adams =

American physics educator

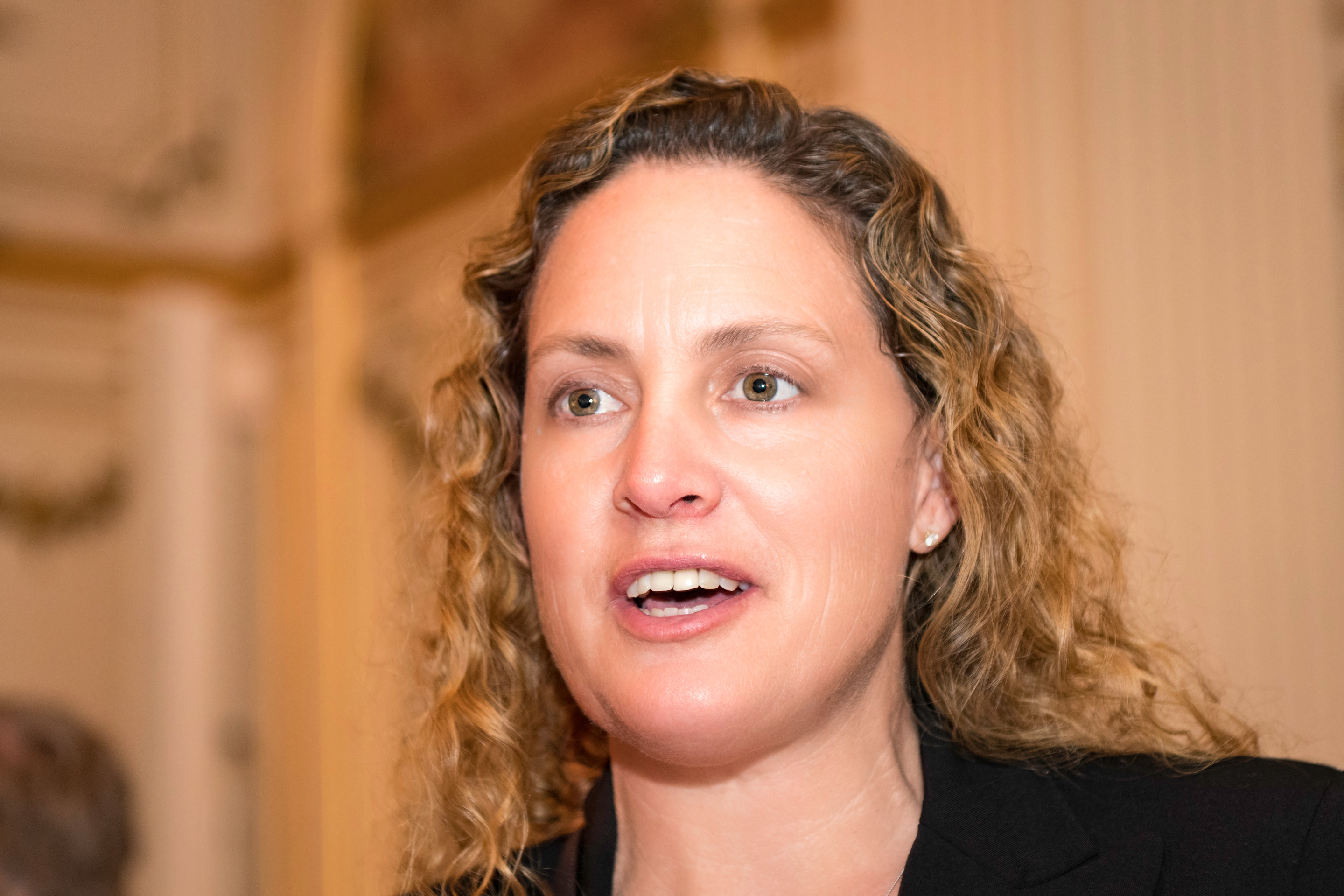
Wendy Adams at the 2017 Prizes and Awards APS Presidential Reception

Wendy K. Adams is an American physics educator. She is known for her work on interactive educational simulations of physics including the PhET Interactive Simulations project, on the effectiveness of peer discussions on conceptual understanding of physics, on measurement of student beliefs about physical concepts, on public beliefs about what it is like to be a physics teacher, and on other aspects of physics education. She is a research professor of physics in the Colorado School of Mines and the executive director of Get the Facts Out, a national multi-society effort to repair the reputation of the teaching profession.

== Education and career ==
Adams is originally from Colorado, and graduated from the University of Northern Colorado in 1994 with a bachelor's degree in physics. She earned a master's degree in physics from the University of Colorado Boulder in 1996, and returned to the University of Colorado Boulder for a Ph.D. in physics with a specialty in Physics Education Research, which she completed in 2008 under the supervision of Carl Wieman. She became a faculty member at the Colorado School of Mines in 2017.

== Research ==
Adams focuses her research on designing curriculum and formative assessment. She works on problem-solving evaluation and has developed several improvements. An example of her developed curricula is the Explore Sound project, which involves K-14 materials for acoustics. Her evaluation work includes CLASS, a tool to measure physics students' perceptions of the topic and how they learn, and interface design guidelines for PhET Interactive Simulations. Her latest development is the PTaP instrument: perceptions of teaching as a profession.

== Recognition ==
Adams was the 2018 winner of the Excellence in Physics Education Award of the American Physical Society (APS). The award cited her "systematic development, dissemination, and evaluation of the physics education tool, PhET Interactive Simulations project, used world-wide by millions of students and their teachers". In 2019 she was named a Fellow of the American Physical Society, after a nomination by the APS Forum on Education, "for impactful physics education research and the subsequent development of assessments in the areas of problem solving, student beliefs, and teacher preparation, leading to a range of improvements such as increased student learning and reductions in physics teacher shortages".
