= Cornelis Jacobus Gorter =

Dutch physicist (1907–1980)

Cornelis Jacobus (Cor) Gorter (14 August 1907, Utrecht – 30 March 1980, Leiden) was a Dutch experimental and theoretical physicist. Among other work, he discovered paramagnetic relaxation and was a pioneer in low temperature physics.

== Education and career ==
After his Abitur in The Hague, Gorter studied physics in Leiden, earning his PhD with the thesis Paramagnetische Eigenschaften von Salzen ("Paramagnetic Properties of Salts") under Wander de Haas. From 1931 to 1936 he worked at Teylers Stichting in Haarlem and from 1936 to 1940 at the University of Groningen, before he became a professor at the University of Amsterdam as successor to Pieter Zeeman. In 1946, succeeding W. H. Keesom, he returned to Leiden as a professor. In 1948, as successor to De Haas, Gorter directed the Kamerlingh Onnes Laboratory, remaining there until his retirement in 1973. He died in Leiden in 1980, after suffering for several years from Alzheimer's disease. His doctoral students include Nicolaas Bloembergen and Bert Broer.

== Work ==
In 1936 he discovered paramagnetic relaxation; however, he missed the discovery of nuclear magnetic resonance, as described by Joan Henri Van der Waals.

With Hendrik Casimir he devised a two-fluid model to explain superconductivity with thermodynamics and Maxwell's equations. Casimir described their collaboration in one of his books. The Gorter model for a second-order phase transition is from this period of his career, as well as the elucidation of the Senftleben effect (change of viscosity and thermal conductivity of paramagnetic gas in a magnetic field).

The second-order phase transition was for a while controversial, as it seems to require two sheets of the Gibbs free energy to osculate exactly, which is so unlikely as to never occur in practice. Gorter replied the criticism by pointing out that the Gibbs free energy surface might have two sheets on one side, but only one sheet on the other side, creating a forked appearance.

Gorter studied many aspects of antiferromagnetism in CuCl_{2}·2H_{2}O. With Johannes Haantjes, he developed a theoretical model of antiferromagnetism in a double-lattice substance. After WWII he worked on liquid helium II and developed the theory which is now known as Coulomb blockade, the increase in electrical resistance in metal films at low temperatures. The Gorter–Mellink equation describes the mutual friction of two fluids in liquid helium II.

== Prizes and honors ==
- Membership of the Royal Netherlands Academy of Arts and Sciences in 1946.
- Membership to the American Academy of Arts and Sciences in 1952.
- Fritz London Award in 1966 for his various contributions to the physics of low temperatures. His acceptance speech discusses the discoveries he missed.
- Membership to the United States National Academy of Sciences in 1967.
- Membership to the American Philosophical Society in 1970.
- In the autumn of 2007, the C. J. Gorter Center for High-field MRI was opened in Leiden.

== Publications ==
- scientific articles
- Book (in Dutch) Paramagnetische relaxatie, Leiden, November 1946
- Progress in Low Temperature Physics, six parts under his editorship

== Sources ==
- Biography
- (in Dutch) Biografie door H.A.M. Snelders in Biografisch Woordenboek van Nederland
