= Peter Mazur =

Dutch physicist (1922–2001)

- Mazur lecturing on non-equilibrium thermodynamics in Trondheim, 1967
- Born: 11 December 1922; Vienna, Austria
- Died: 15 August 2001 (aged 78); Lausanne, Switzerland
- Education: Utrecht University
- Known for: non-equilibrium thermodynamics
- Scientific career
- Fields: Physics
- Workplaces: Leiden University
- Thesis: Thermodynamique des phénomènes de transport dans l'Helium II liquide (1951)
- Doctoral advisor: Sybren de Groot
- Doctoral students: Wim van Saarloos; Carlo Beenakker

Peter Mazur (born Vienna, Austria, 11 December 1922; died Lausanne, Switzerland, 15 August 2001) was an Austrian-born, Dutch physicist and one of the founders of the field of non-equilibrium thermodynamics. He is the father of Harvard University physics professor Eric Mazur.

== Family ==
Peter Mazur was born on 11 December 1922 in Vienna, Austria. His father, Karl Georg Mazur, a businessman, and mother, Anna Zula Lecker, frequently moved during Mazur's youth. In 1931 the family left for Berlin, where Mazur attended the Französisches Gymnasium. Two years later the family left Germany to escape the growing threat of National Socialism. After spending one year in Switzerland they moved to Paris where Mazur attended the Lycée Janson de Sailly. In 1939 Mazur moved to The Hague in the Netherlands, but in 1940 the occupying Nazis no longer permitted Jews to live near the seacoast and the family moved to Zeist. In 1942 Mazur and his family went into hiding and he spent three years on various farms in the Dutch countryside. One month after the liberation of the Netherlands at the end of World War II, Mazur was reunited with his parents.

== Education ==
After the end of the war, Mazur studied Chemistry at the University of Utrecht in the Netherlands. In 1951, Mazur obtained his doctorate under the direction of Sybren de Groot with a thesis entitled, "Thermodynamics of Transport Phenomena in Liquid Helium-2". The results were in good agreement with experiments done at the Kamerlingh Onnes Laboratory in Leiden, the Netherlands.

== Career ==
After a period as a postdoctoral fellow at the University of Maryland, College Park in 1953, Mazur became an associate professor at Leiden University in 1954. In 1955, he and de Groot, who had also moved to Leiden, founded the Lorentz Institute for Theoretical Physics at Leiden University. In 1961, Mazur became a full professor, and when de Groot left in 1963, he became director of the institute. He filled this position in his own distinctive way for 25 years until he became emeritus in 1988. Under the direction of de Groot and Mazur, the institute grew substantially and eventually established the Lorentz Chair, a prestigious special professorship.

Mazur served on the boards of the International Union of Pure and Applied Physics (1966–84) and the Dutch Foundation for Fundamental Research of Matter (1970–85). In 1987, Queen Beatrix made Mazur a Knight of the Order of the Netherlands Lion.

In 1970 Mazur became a member of the Royal Netherlands Academy of Arts and Sciences.

== Work ==
In his first years at Leiden University, Mazur studied the classical and quantum molecular foundations of non-equilibrium thermodynamics. Significant results included the derivation of the Langevin equation with Irwin Oppenheim and the classic paper on harmonic oscillator systems by George Ford, Mark Kac, and Mazur, which was published in the Journal of Mathematical Physics (in 1965). Mazur's work in the 1950s and 1960s culminated in the publication of Nonequilibrium Thermodynamics (North Holland and Interscience, 1962), written by de Groot and Mazur. This book, translated into several languages, became a classic in the field and was later republished as a series of classic monographs.

Mazur's work in subsequent years addressed a variety of problems in statistical mechanics. He had a good nose for problems ripe to be investigated. To describe diffusion of large particles in fluids, he introduced, together with Dick Bedeaux, the concept of induced forces in 1974. This concept was used to derive generalizations of Faxén's theorem and to develop a theory for the viscosity of a suspension. In 1976, Mazur, with Bedeaux and Alfonso Albano, gave the first systematic formulation of nonequilibrium thermodynamics for surfaces. This formulation opened a new field, which is still in active development. And Mazur, Wim van Saarloos, and Carlo Beenakker developed an algebraic method around 1982 to successfully describe hydrodynamic interactions between arbitrary numbers of particles using induced forces. This was a breakthrough in the field.

After retiring in 1988, Mazur remained active. In 1991, he derived, with Bedeaux, the Langevin equation for a Brownian particle using only causality and time reversal invariance. From 1994 to 2000, Mazur, together with J. Miguel Rubi, used the method of internal degrees of freedom to describe fluctuations in the context of nonequilibrium thermodynamics. In 2001, he and Bedeaux developed nonequilibrium thermodynamics for quantum systems.
