= Thermal Hall effect =

Magneto-thermic effect in metals

In solid-state physics, the thermal Hall effect, also known as the Righi–Leduc effect, named after independent co-discoverers Augusto Righi and Sylvestre Anatole Leduc, is the thermal analog of the Hall effect. Given a thermal gradient across a solid, this effect describes the appearance of an orthogonal temperature gradient when a magnetic field is applied.

For conductors, a significant portion of the thermal current is carried by the electrons. In particular, the Righi–Leduc effect describes the heat flow resulting from a perpendicular temperature gradient and vice versa. The Maggi–Righi–Leduc effect, named after Gian Antonio Maggi, describes changes in thermal conductivity when placing a conductor in a magnetic field.

A thermal Hall effect has also been measured in a paramagnetic insulators, called the "phonon Hall effect". In this case, there are no charged currents in the solid, so the magnetic field cannot exert a Lorentz force. Phonon thermal Hall effects have been measured in various classes of non-magnetic insulating solids, but the exact mechanism giving rise to this phenomenon is largely unknown. An analogous thermal Hall effect for neutral particles exists in polyatomic gases, known as the Senftleben–Beenakker effect.

Measurements of the thermal Hall conductivity are used to distinguish between the electronic and lattice contributions to thermal conductivity. These measurements are especially useful when studying superconductors.

== Description ==
Given a conductor or semiconductor with a temperature difference in the x-direction and a magnetic field B perpendicular to it in the z-direction, then a temperature difference can occur in the transverse y-direction,

$$\frac{\partial T}{\partial y} = R_{\mathrm{TH}} B  \frac{\partial T}{\partial x}$$

The Righi–Leduc effect is a thermal analogue of the Hall effect. With the Hall effect, an externally applied electrical voltage causes an electrical current to flow. The mobile charge carriers (usually electrons) are transversely deflected by the magnetic field due to the Lorentz force. In the Righi–Leduc effect, the temperature difference causes the mobile charge carriers to flow from the warmer end to the cooler end. Here, too, the Lorentz force causes a transverse deflection. Since the electrons transport heat, one side is heated more than the other.

The thermal Hall coefficient $R_{\mathrm{TH}}$ (sometimes also called the Righi–Leduc coefficient) depends on the material and has units of tesla^{−1}. It is related to the Hall coefficient $R_{\mathrm{H}}$ by the electrical conductivity $\sigma$, as

$$R_{\rm TH}=\sigma R_{\rm H}$$.

== See also ==
- Hall effect
