= Hermann Senftleben =

German physicist

Hermann Senftleben (April 8, 1890, in Bremen – 1975 in Recklinghausen) was a German physicist and physical chemist.

== Education and life ==
Senftleben was born in Bremen. After graduating from the König-Wilhelm-Gymnasium in Breslau, Senftleben studied physics at the University of Breslau and received his doctorate with Rudolf Ladenburg. The dissertation was about the glow of flames, which he attributed in part to light scattering from small particles in the flame. He was then an assistant in Breslau (with Carl Hintze, Arnold Eucken and Otto Lummer) and Marburg (with Clemens Schaefer), where he habilitated in 1924 and became a privatdozent at University of Marburg. From 1935 until his retirement in 1958 he was a full professor at the University of Münster. He also conducted research there from 1946 to 1961 as an employee at the Marl Chemical Park.

Stimulated by Eucken, he turned to physical chemistry in the 1930s. Among other things, he researched on the direct proof of the dissociation of molecules by collisions of the second kind, the course of the reaction in the production of hydrogen and the electron affinity of oxygen. In particular, however, he investigated the conduction of heat in gases.

The Senftleben-Beenakker effects are named after him and Jan Beenakker, the influence of electric and magnetic fields on the transport properties (thermal conductivity, viscosity) of molecular gases.
