= Carlo Beenakker =

Dutch physicist (b. 1960)

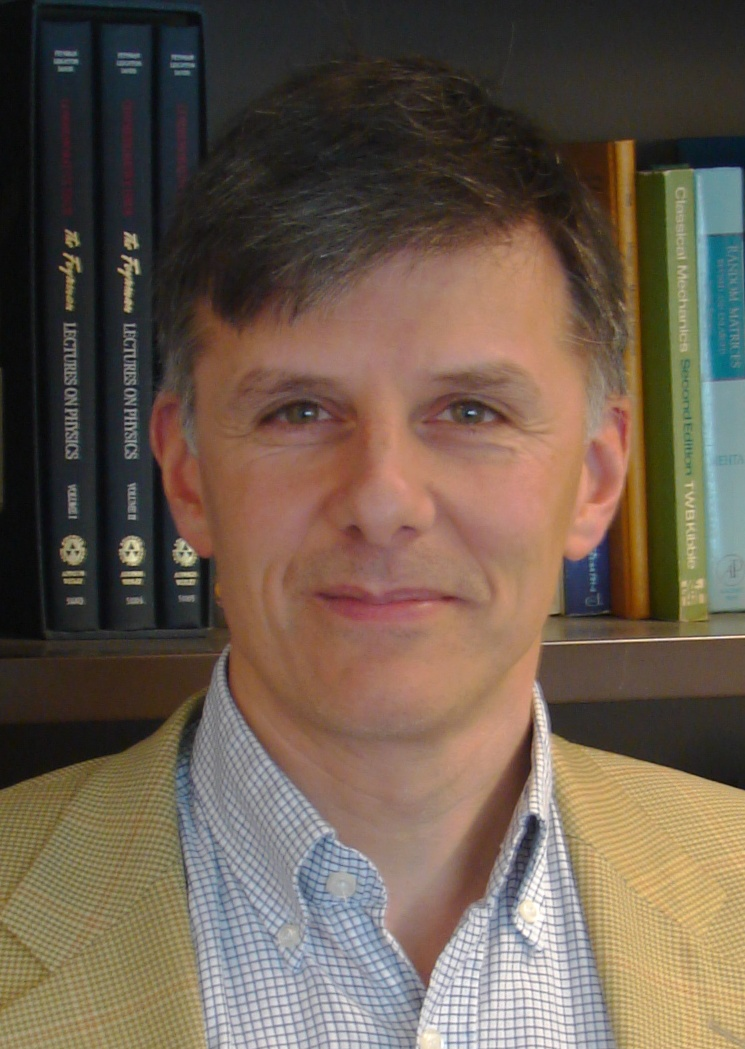
- Carlo Beenakker at Leiden University in April 2007
- Born: 9 June 1960 (age 66); Leiden, Netherlands
- Education: Leiden University
- Father: Jan Beenakker
- Awards: Spinoza Prize (1999)
- Scientific career
- Fields: Theoretical physics, quantum science, nanoscience
- Thesis: On transport properties of concentrated suspensions (1984)
- Doctoral advisor: Peter Mazur
- Website: www.lorentz.leidenuniv.nl/beenakker/

Carlo Willem Joannes Beenakker (born 9 June 1960) is a professor at Leiden University and leader of the university's mesoscopic physics group, established in 1992.

== Education and career ==
Born in Leiden as the son of physicists Jan Beenakker and Elena Manaresi, Beenakker graduated from Leiden University in 1982 and obtained his doctorate two years later.

After the awarding of his doctorate, he then spent one year working in the United States of America as a fellow of the Niels Stensen Foundation before returning to the Netherlands as a member of the scientific staff of the Philips Research Laboratories in Eindhoven. He joined the Lorentz Institute for theoretical physics at Leiden University in 1991.

== Work ==
His work in mesoscopic physics addresses fundamental physical problems that occur when a macroscopic object is miniaturized to dimensions on the nanoscale. Quantum mechanical effects then play a decisive role, as demonstrated in the quantum point contact (a narrow constriction with a quantized conductance). To understand the universal quantum mechanical properties of mesoscopic systems, Beenakker adapted methods from the theory of random matrices, originally developed in the context of nuclear physics. Discoveries by Beenakker and colleagues include the one-third suppression of shot noise in metallic conductors and specular Andreev reflection in graphene.

== Recognition ==
In 1993, he shared the Royal/Shell prize for "the discovery and explanation of quantum effects in the electrical conduction in mesoscopic systems". He was elected a member of the Royal Holland Society of Sciences and Humanities in 2001, and the Royal Netherlands Academy of Arts and Sciences in 2002. He was awarded one of the Netherlands' most prestigious science awards, the Spinozapremie, in 1999. In 2006 he was honored with the AkzoNobel Science Award "for his pioneering work in the field of nanoscience". He was granted an honorary doctorate from the Bogolyubov Institute for Theoretical Physics of the National Academy of Sciences of Ukraine. Beenakker is a Fellow of the American Association for the Advancement of Science and of the American Physical Society and a Knight of the Order of the Netherlands Lion.
