= PhET Interactive Simulations =

Non-profit open educational resource project

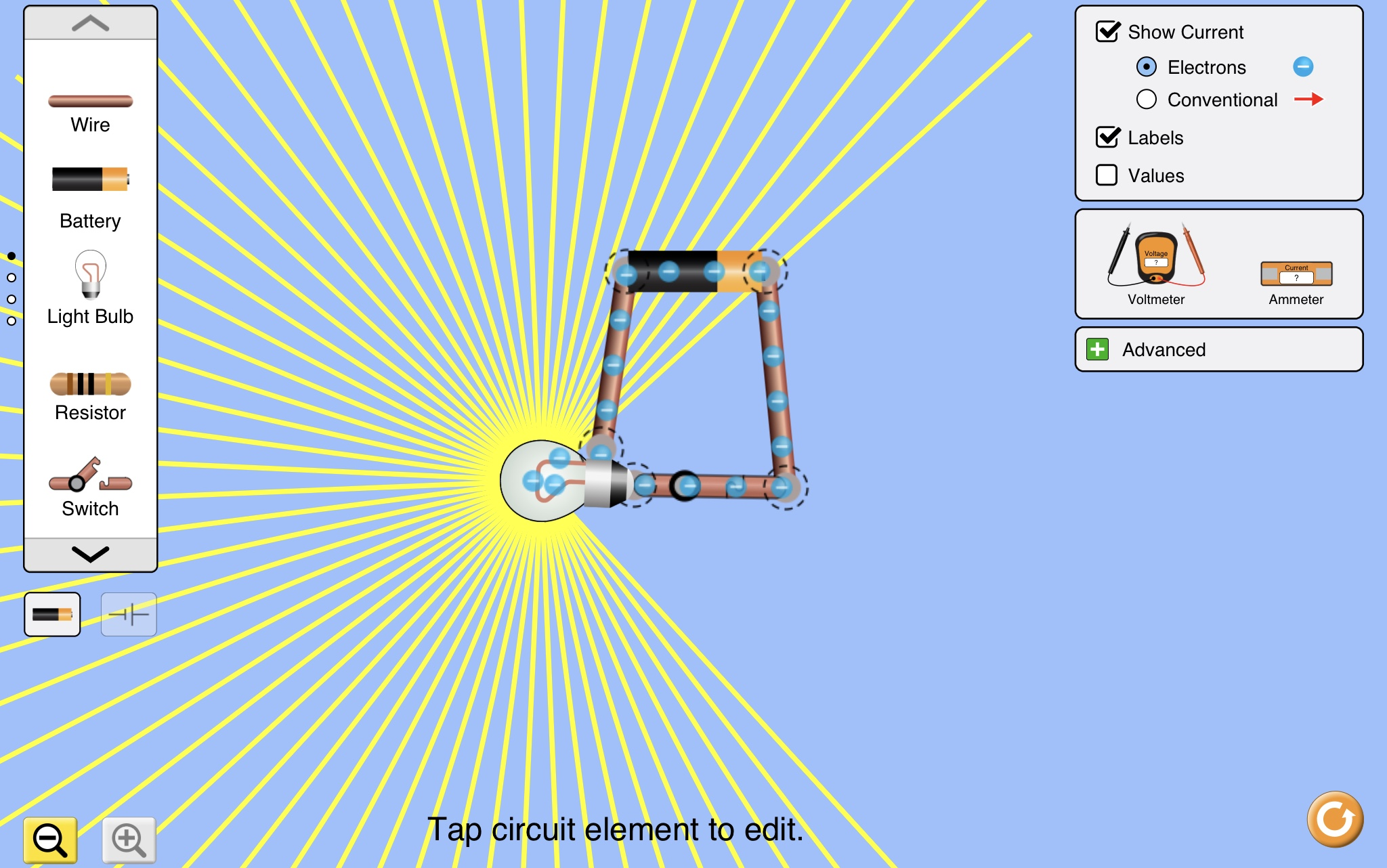
- Screenshot of PhET's Circuit Construction Kit Simulation
- Website type: Online education
- Available in: English, Afrikaans, Arabic, Bengali, Brazilian Portuguese, Chinese, Danish, Dutch, Finnish, French, German, Greek, Gujarati, Hebrew, Hindi, Indonesian, Italian, Japanese, Korean, Marathi, Norwegian, Odia, Persian, Polish, Russian, Spanish, Thai, Turkish, Uzbek Vietnamese
- Creator: Carl Wieman
- Website: phet.colorado.edu
- Commercial: No
- Launched: 2002
- Content license: Creative Commons; Attribution-NonCommercial 4.0

PhET Interactive Simulations, a project at the University of Colorado Boulder, is a non-profit open educational resource project that creates and hosts explorable explanations. It was founded in 2002 by Nobel Laureate Carl Wieman. PhET began with Wieman's vision to improve the way science is taught and learned. Their stated mission is "To advance science and math literacy and education worldwide through free interactive simulations."

The project acronym "PhET" originally stood for "Physics Education Technology," but PhET soon expanded to other disciplines. The project now designs, develops, and releases over 125 free interactive simulations for educational use in the fields of physics, chemistry, biology, earth science, and mathematics. The simulations have been translated into over 121 different languages, including Spanish, Chinese, German, and Arabic; and in 2011, the PhET website received over 25 million visitors.

In October 2011, PhET Interactive Simulations was chosen as the 2011 Microsoft Education Tech Award laureate. The Tech Awards, presented by The Tech Museum of Innovation, honor innovators from around the world for technology benefitting humanity.

== History ==
After winning the Nobel Prize in 2001, Wieman became involved with efforts to improved science education and has conducted educational research on science instruction. He helped write Physics 2000 to provide simulations to explain his work in creating the Bose-Einstein condensate. As he gave public lectures, some incorporating simulations, he noticed that "often the simulations would be the primary thing people would remember from my talk. Based on their questions and comments, it appeared that they consistently learned the physics represented in the simulations."

He used money from a grant from the National Science Foundation Distinguished Teaching Scholars program, the Kavli Foundation, and a portion of his Nobel Prize money to found PhET to improve the way that physics is taught and learned. The PhET simulations differ from the Physics 2000 ones because users can interact with the simulation to change conditions, whereas the Physics 2000 simulations are just videos.

In 2007, Wieman moved to Vancouver, British Columbia while retaining 20% faculty position at the University of Colorado Boulder. The current director of PhET is Katherine K. Perkins, who has been with PhET since January 2003. Perkins hopes that the simulations' accessibility and interactive nature will increase scientific literacy and promote student engagement in the classroom.

== Organization ==
PhET Interactive Simulations is part of the University of Colorado Boulder which is a member of the Association of American Universities. The team changes over time and has about 16 members consisting of professors, post-doctoral students, researchers, education specialists, software engineers (sometimes contractors), educators, and administrative assistants. The current director of PhET is Dr. Katherine Perkins.

== Design and educational impact ==
PhET Interactive Simulations incorporates research-based practices on effective teaching to enhance the learning of scientific and mathematical concepts. The simulations are designed to be flexible so that they can be used as lecture demonstrations, labs, or homework activities.

A PhET simulation's development starts with three to five people including a content expert (scientist), a teacher, an educational researcher, and a professional software developer. Specific learning goals are identified that have proven to be conceptually difficult based on teachers' experiences in the classroom. The simulation's design, look and feel are storyboarded, discussed, and then finally "coded." Each simulation is user-tested through interviews with students and in classrooms, re-worked as needed and re-tested, before it is released on the PhET website.

Along with testing every simulation, the PhET team performs education research on their simulations. In their research, they found that students' understanding of concepts improves when they explore simulations in addition to traditional labs.

=== Usage by educators ===
While PhET Interactive Simulations develops the simulations, it is primarily teachers and publishers who develop the educational activities which use the simulations, sharing these with the community. Contributors on the PhET site follow Open Education Practices (OEP), enabling teachers to use or adapt the activities freely.

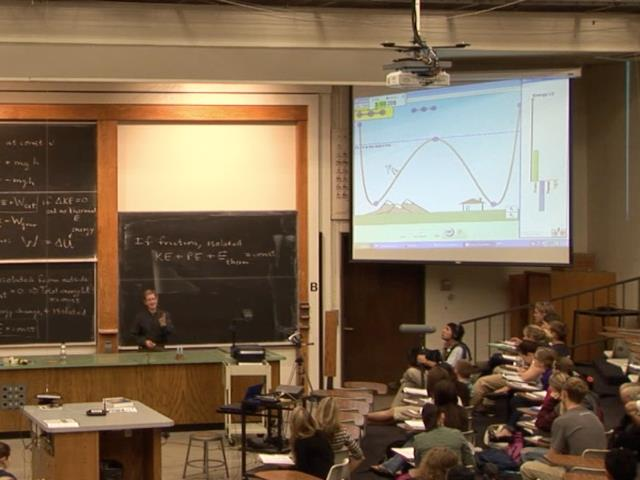
PhET simulations used as part of a larger lecture course

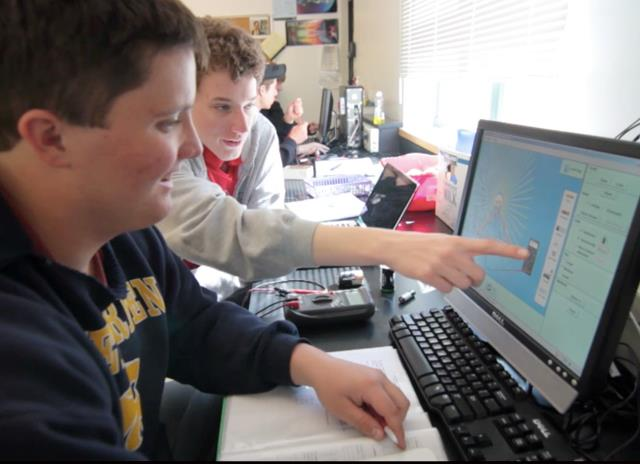
High school students using PhET for a lab

Other Open Education Resource organizations that provide ideas and reviews include:

- National Science Digital Library (NSDL) provides interactive Science Literacy Maps aligned to American Association for the Advancement of Science (AAAS) benchmarks with links to relevant online resources. NSDL mines metadata of collections to find online resources that match the benchmarks. The collections mined are chosen based on criteria proposed by a National Research Council Steering Committee for Developing a Digital National Library for Undergraduate Science, Mathematics, Engineering, and Technology Education and the validity checked regularly. Teachers find PhET sims that are appropriate for specific topics by searching the maps.
- MERLOT Physics uses a tiered review process to evaluate digital learning content. PhET was featured as a Showcase in June 2013 where teachers can find teaching and learning resources that includes: Links to Member-Selected Learning Materials, Peer Reviews of High Quality Materials, and Teaching Experiences of MERLOT Members.
- Physics Front is a "free service provided by the AAPT in partnership with the NSF/NSDL" that has about 100 ideas for using PhET with editor reviews, recommended subjects, levels, resource type, appropriate courses, categories and ratings; ideas for use in units, correlation to AAAS standards; and related activities.
- Pedagogy in Action provides access to a library with three elements: Teaching Methods Modules, Learning Activities, and Research on Learning Bibliography. Pedagogy in Action contains an article "Resources for using PhET simulations in class – PhET Activities Database" which includes summary, learning goals, context for use, description and teaching materials, Teaching Notes and Tips, Assessment, and Guidelines for developing new activities using PhET.
- iNACOL, The International Association for K-12 Online Learning strategic priorities include policy advocacy, quality assurance project, and learning models. Their publications and website support a wide variety of groups which improve student personalized learning and teachers' conditions by advocating for professional development. One report provides ideas for using open educational resources specifically for online learning which includes uses for PhET sims.

Professional organizations also provide ideas for using PhET simulations. In the JCE Chemical Education Xchange (ChemEd X), members have blogged about how using PhET can help with specific topics like Stoichiometry Resources, First Week Excitement, PHYSICS 2000, and Adding Inquiry to Atomic Theory.

=== Research on use of simulations in education ===
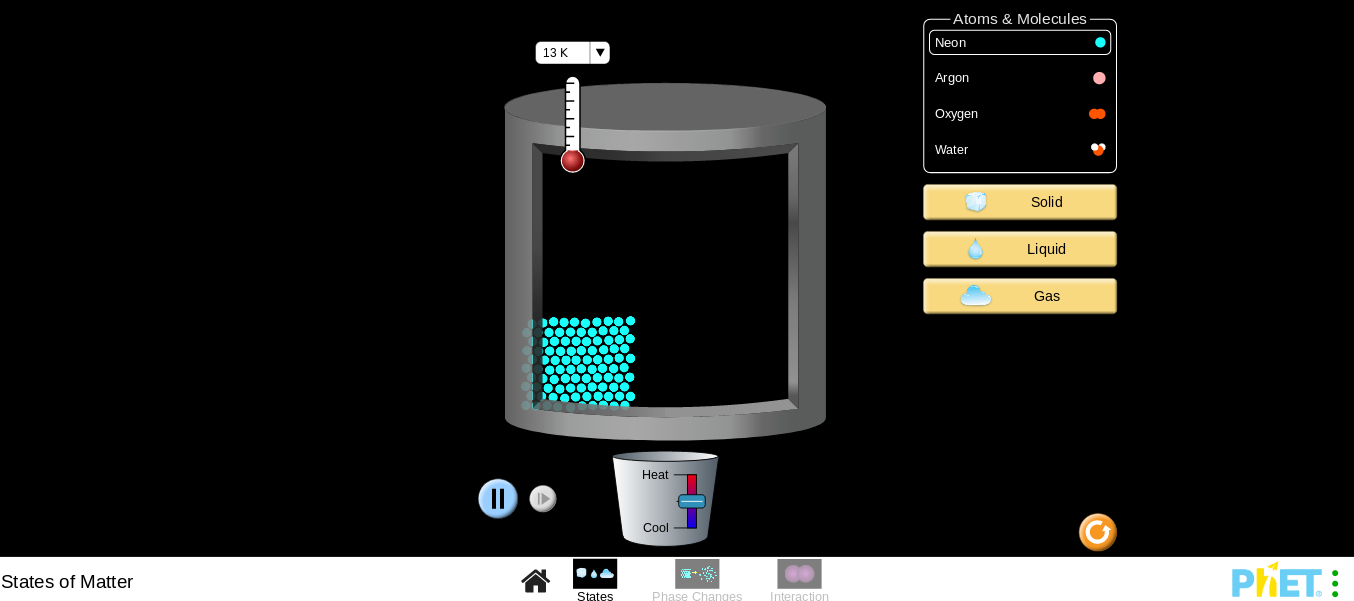
Example screenshot of a simulation in PhET

The National Science Foundation has provided grants for several organizations to study PhET use:

Grant	Number	Principal investigator	Co-principal investigator	Organization	Date
PhET Interactive Simulations: Using Research-Based Simulations to Transform Undergraduate Chemistry Education	#1226321	Katherine Perkins	Robert Parson	University of Colorado at Boulder	September 15, 2012
Expanding PhET Interactive Science Simulations to Grades 4-8: A Research-based Approach	#1020362				
Changing how physics students approach learning with simulations: Research and development of PhET-based tutorials	#1245400	Katherine Perkins	Michael Dubson, Daniel Schwartz, Noah Podolefsky	University of Colorado at Boulder	September 1, 2010
Physics Education Research User's Guide: A Web Resource for Physics Educators	#1245490	Andrew Elby	Ayush Gupta	University of Maryland College Park	June 15, 2013
Physics Education Research User's Guide: A Web Resource for Physics Educators	#1245490	Sarah McKagan	Bruce Mason, Beth Cunningham	American Association of Physics Teachers	May 1, 2013
Physics Education Technology Project	#0442841	Carl Wieman	Noah Finkelstein, Katherine Perkins	University of Colorado at Boulder	June 1, 2005
Physics and Chemistry Education Technology Project	#0817582	Katherine Perkins	Michael Dubson, Noah Finkelstein, Robert Parson, Carl Wieman	University of Colorado at Boulder	August 1, 2008
Expanding PhET Interactive Science Simulations to Grades 4-8: A Research-based Approach	#1020362	Katherine Perkins	Michael Dubson, Daniel Schwartz, Noah Podolefsky	University of Colorado at Boulder	September 1, 2010
The Physics of Everyday Life: Java Applets and Interactive Lecture Demonstrations for Non-science Students	#0123561	Carl Wieman		University of Colorado at Boulder	September 1, 2001
