= Ka Yee Christina Lee =

Professor of Chemistry

- 利嘉宜
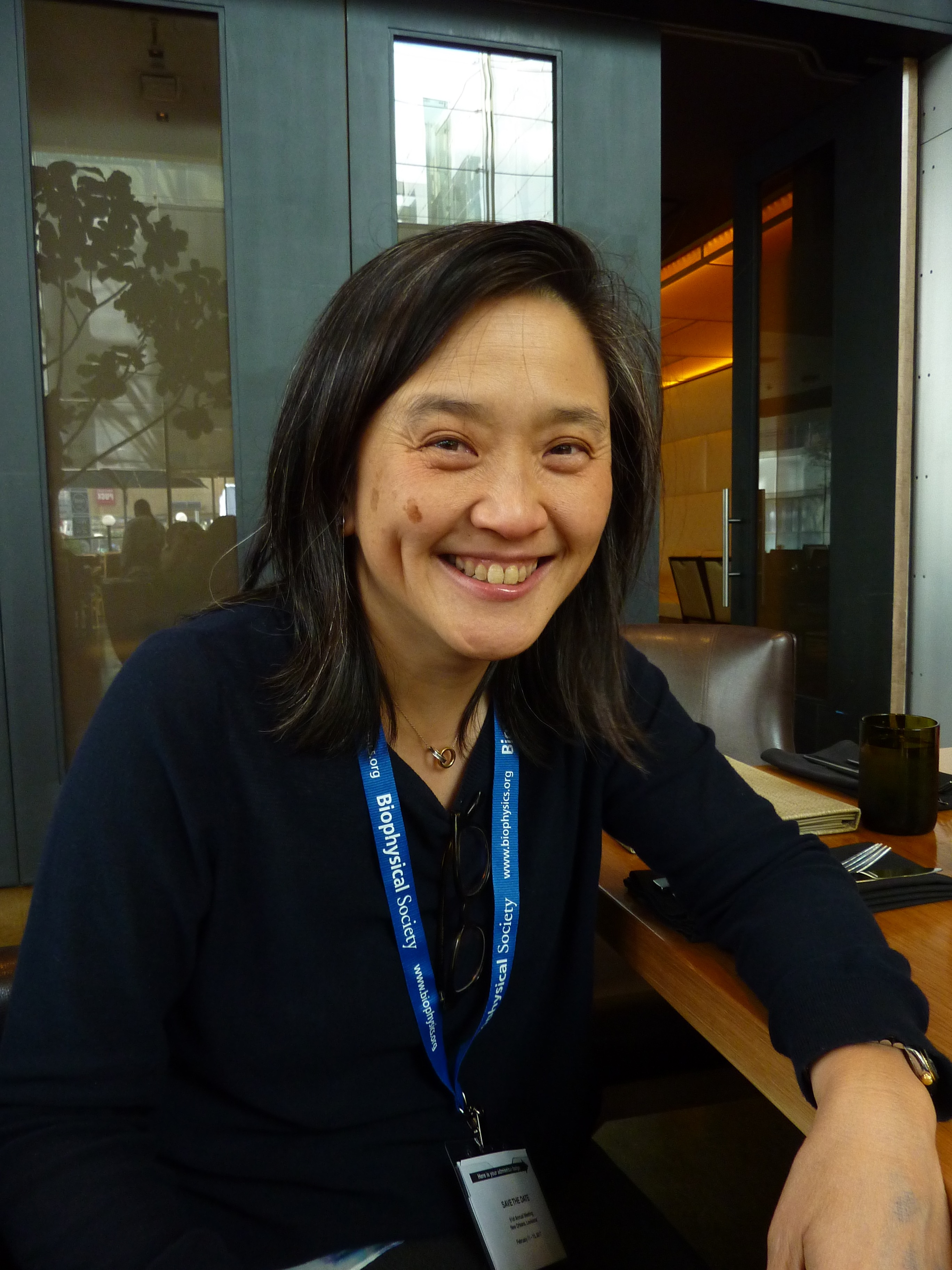
- Ka Yee Lee at the 2016 Biophysical Society meeting in Los Angeles
- Born: 1964 (age 61–62); Hong Kong
- Other name: Lee Ka-yee
- Education: Brown University (BS); Harvard University (MS, PhD)
- Scientific career
- Fields: Physical chemistry
- Institutions: Stanford University; University of California, Santa Barbara; University of Chicago
- Thesis: Optical studies of capillary waves at liquid-vapor interfaces (1992)
- Doctoral advisor: Eric Mazur
- Website: leelab.uchicago.edu

Ka Yee Christina Lee (Chinese: 利嘉宜) is Hong Kong-born American chemist. She is Executive Vice President for Strategic Initiatives and the David Lee Shillinglaw Distinguished Service Professor in the Department of Chemistry at the University of Chicago. She works on membrane biophysics, including protein–lipid interactions, Alzheimer's disease and respiratory distress syndrome. She is a Fellow of the American Institute for Medical and Biological Engineering, the American Physical Society, and the Biophysical Society.

== Early life and education ==
Lee was born in Hong Kong. Lee completed her bachelor's degree in electrical engineering at Brown University in 1986. She joined Harvard University for her graduate studies in applied physics, earning her master's in 1987 and PhD in 1992. She worked under the supervision of Eric Mazur on liquid-vapour interfaces. Lee was a postdoctoral researcher with Harden M. McConnell at Stanford University and with Joseph Zasadzinski at the University of California, Santa Barbara.

== Research and career ==
Lee joined the department of chemistry at the University of Chicago in 1998, and was made a full professor in 2008. She has made significant contributions to the understanding of molecular behaviour in lipid films. She investigates the functionality of lung surfactant, mechanisms of antimicrobial peptides, sealing effects of polymers and recognition of lipids in receptors that regulate immunity. She looks to control biomembranes that can mimic real-life systems to understand Alzheimer's disease and respiratory distress syndrome. Lee uses microscopy, x-ray and neutron scattering to establish the interactions of lipids and proteins.

Lung surfactant, a lipid-protein mixture, forms at the alveolar air-water interface. A lack of surfactant in premature infants can result in infant respiratory distress syndrome (RDS). In an effort to improve interventions for patients with RDS, Lee's research group look to identify the relationships between structure and function in lung surfactant, as well as establishing how the surfactant interacts with nearby proteins. She also studies the role of amyloid beta, a residue generated by the processing of the amyloid precursor protein, and Alzheimer's disease. The Lee group look to establish a model for Ab aggregation, identifying which Ab isoforms are associated with Alzheimer's disease pathology. She has also studied the mechanisms that allow the formation of the myelin sheath. Using transmission electron microscopy, her group studied the self-assembly of myelin lipids into tubules and subsequent transition into lamellar. Using atomic force microscopy the Lee group monitored the interactions of antimicrobial peptides with biomembranes. She demonstrated that peptides share a common interaction which is driven by membrane line tension reduction.

Her research group developed a self-healing gel that works underwater; a synthetic version of the substance that mussels use to anchor to rocks in the ocean. Mussels contain byssal threads, which resist material failure by limiting crack propagation. The Lee group identified ways to control the crosslinking of catechol and Fe^{3+} using pH. Her group went on to study the mechanical properties of hydrogels regulated by pH, demonstrating it is possible to design a range of synthetic materials using mimicry of mussel proteins.

Lee has also demonstrated that geometric tools can be used to study complex and non-linear biological interfaces. She showed that thin elastic membranes can adopt both periodically wrinkled or folded morphologies. When compression of membranes exceeds one third of their 'wrinkled wavelength', the membranes fold, eventually transforming into a symmetry-broken state that looks crumpled.

=== Academic service and advocacy ===
Lee served as director of the National Science Foundation Materials Research Science and Engineering Center. Lee is committed to increasing opportunities for women and minority students to take part in scientific research, and regularly hosts students for summer research programs. Lee is an advocate for women in science, and was a founding member of the Chicago Collaboration on Women in Science. The collaboration supports women faculty members in Northwestern University and the University of Chicago.

Lee served as a member of the steering committees of the University of Chicago centres in Beijing and Hong Kong. Lee was appointed vice provost for research in August 2018. In that capacity, she worked with faculty and deans to enhance and expand research activities at the University, and oversaw large-scale research structures, including University Research Administration, University of Chicago Consortium for Advanced Science and Engineering(CASE), Office of Research Safety, Research Computing Center and Research Development Support.

Lee was appointed provost of the University of Chicago on January 7, 2020, and began her term on February 1. She stepped away from the role in March 2023 to assume the position of executive vice president for strategic initiatives at the university.

== Awards and honors ==
- 1999 David and Lucile Packard Foundation Fellow
- 2001 Margaret Oakley Dayhoff Award
- 2007 University of Chicago Llewellyn John and Harriet Manchester Quantrell Award for Excellence in Undergraduate Teaching
- 2009 American Physical Society Fellow
- 2009 American Chemical Society Astella USA Foundation Award
- 2013 American Institute for Medical and Biological Engineering Fellow
- 2013 University of Chicago Arthur L. Kelly Faculty Prize
- 2013 Phi Beta Kappa Fellow
- 2023 Biophysical Society Fellow
