= Katherine K. Perkins =

American physics educator

Katherine K. "Kathy" Perkins is a physics educator who directs the PhET Interactive Simulations project at the University of Colorado Boulder, where she also holds attendant rank as a professor of physics.

== Education and career ==
Perkins was a student at Harvard University, from which she has a 1992 bachelor's degree in physics, a master's degree in chemistry, and a 2000 doctorate in atmospheric science, also working as an environmental consultant before completing her graduate studies. Her doctoral dissertation concerned ozone depletion and the measurement of ozone-depleting chemicals in the atmosphere.

After postdoctoral research at the National Oceanic and Atmospheric Administration, she has been affiliated with the PhET project since 2003, initially working as a postdoctoral researcher for Carl Wieman, the founder of the project. She became its director in 2008. She directed the Science Education Initiative at the university, and is professor attendant rank in physics, associated with the Physics Education Research Group.

== Recognition ==
Perkins was named as a Fellow of the American Physical Society, in the 2021 class of fellows, "for profound contributions to physics education through the vision and leadership of the PhET project, resulting in the creation of many high-quality interactive simulations for teaching physics to hundreds of millions of students and teachers globally".
