= Sam McKagan =

American physics educator

Sarah Busby (Sam) McKagan (also published as Sarah B. McKinney) is an American physics educator who directs several online portals for education resources in physics and related subjects. These include PhysPort and the Living Physics Portal of the American Association of Physics Teachers, aimed at physics and physics for the life sciences, respectively, and Effective Practices for Physics Programs (EP3), a project of the American Physical Society.

Her research publications have included work on instructional simulations, concept inventories, and gender gaps in physics education.

== Education and career ==
McKagan majored in physics at Barnard College, graduating summa cum laude in 1998. She went to the University of Washington in Seattle for graduate study in physics, earning a master's degree in 2000 and completing her Ph.D. in 2004. Her dissertation, Dynamics of Bose-Einstein Condensates in Optical Lattices, was supervised by William P. Reinhardt.

She became a researcher in physics education at JILA, a joint research institute of the University of Colorado Boulder and the National Institute of Standards and Technology, from 2005 to 2008, and at Seattle Pacific University from 2009 to 2013. She founded PhysPort in 2009, became design and development director of the Living Physics Portal in 2016, and became editorial director of Effective Practices for Physics Programs in 2016.

== Recognition ==
McKagan was a 2013 recipient of the Homer L. Dodge Citation for Distinguished Service of the American Association of Physics Teachers. She was elected as a Fellow of the American Physical Society (APS) in 2018, after a nomination from the APS Topical Group on Physics Education Research, "for contributions to physics education research in energy and quantum mechanics, and for supporting excellence in physics teaching by pursuing scholarly efforts on the adoption of effective practices, organizing research-based resources, and creating tools for communities of physics educators".

== Selected publications ==
- McKagan, S. B.; Perkins, K. K.; Dubson, M.; Malley, C.; Reid, S.; LeMaster, R.; Wieman, C. E. (April 2008), "Developing and researching PhET simulations for teaching quantum mechanics", American Journal of Physics, 76 (4): 406–417, arXiv:0709.4503, Bibcode:2008AmJPh..76..406M, doi:10.1119/1.2885199
- McKagan, S. B.; Perkins, K. K.; Wieman, C. E. (November 2010), "Design and validation of the Quantum Mechanics Conceptual Survey", Physical Review Special Topics - Physics Education Research, 6 (2) 020121, arXiv:1007.2015, Bibcode:2010PRPER...6b0121M, doi:10.1103/physrevstper.6.020121
- Madsen, Adrian; McKagan, Sarah B.; Sayre, Eleanor C. (November 2013), "Gender gap on concept inventories in physics: What is consistent, what is inconsistent, and what factors influence the gap?", Physical Review Special Topics - Physics Education Research, 9 (2) 020121, arXiv:1307.0912, Bibcode:2013PRPER...9b0121M, doi:10.1103/physrevstper.9.020121
