= Wim van Saarloos =

Dutch physicist

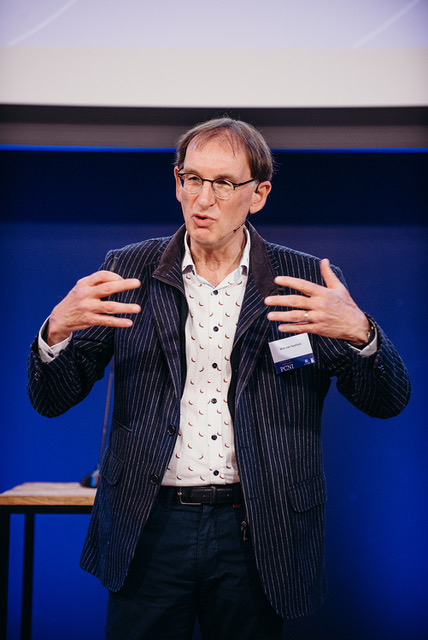
- Born: Franeker, Netherlands
- Occupation: Professor of Theoretical Physics
- Awards: Member of the Royal Netherlands Academy of Arts and Sciences KNAW; Fellow, the American Physical Society

Academic background
- Education: Delft University of Technology (MSc); Leiden University (PhD)
- Thesis: On nonlinear hydrodynamic fluctuations (1982)
- Doctoral advisor: Peter Mazur

Academic work
- Institutions: Leiden University

Wim van Saarloos is a Dutch physicist, academic and researcher. He is a Professor of Theoretical Physics at Leiden University (emeritus since July 2021).

Van Saarloos has written over 280 papers and has been cited over 12000 times. His research interests include Statistical Physics, non-equilibrium pattern formation and soft condensed matter physics. He has also done work on front propagation into unstable states.

Van Saarloos was elected as a Fellow of the American Physical Society in 2007 and received various honors and awards for his research. For founding the Lorentz Center in Leiden, and for bringing the center to fruition as the first director from 1997 to 2009, he received a royal distinction. Since 2009 he has been mostly active promoting science and strengthening the Dutch science system, and on the European level. He was the chair of the Energy Steering Panel of the European Academies Science Advisory Council (EASAC), of which he serves as president from 2023-2025. He also presided the Permanent Committee National Institutes of NWO and Royal Netherlands Academy of Arts and Sciences (KNAW). Earlier, he served as a member of the strategic advisory board of the EU Flagship Quantum Technology, and the High Level Strategy Group on Industrial Technologies. He is presently a member of the Board of Trustees of Sense about Science and the Supervisory Board of the University of Groningen.

== Education ==
From 1973 to 1978, van Saarloos attended Delft University of Technology where he received an undergraduate Engineering degree in physics. He obtained his doctorate in 1982 in theoretical physics (cum laude) from Leiden University, for his thesis "On nonlinear hydrodynamic fluctuations". Right after this, he went for his Postdoctoral research at AT&T Bell Laboratories.

== Career ==
Van Saarloos was member of technical staff in the Materials Physics Research Department from 1984 to 1990 at AT&T Bell Laboratories. In 1991 he joined the Institute-Lorentz for theoretical physics of the physics department of Leiden University. With two colleagues he founded the Lorentz Center in Leiden, an international workshop center in the sciences, and of which he was the first Director from 1997 to 2009.

Van Saarloos was the director at the FOM Foundation from 2010 to 2015, the Foundation for Fundamental Research which was also a part of the NWO (Netherlands Organisation for Scientific Research) for Scientific Research. In 2015 and 2016, he served as Director Transition NWO. Back in academia and in particular again as professor in Leiden since late 2016, he was active within the KNAW, the Royal Netherlands Academy of Arts and Sciences, where he served as vice president from 2016 till 2018, and as president from 2018 to 2020.

== Research ==
Van Saarloos has focused his research on theoretical physics, in particular in statistical and condensed matter physics. His work in pattern formation in non-equilibrium systems centers on the development of the amplitude equation description of systems exhibiting a transition to standing waves. With Hohenberg he developed a classification of fronts, pulses, sources and sinks in such systems.

=== Condensed matter and statistical physics ===
Together with his thesis advisor Mazur, van Saarloos calculated the mobility tensors submerged in viscous fluid of an arbitrary number of spheres in an expansion of power series. Their expressions, which involve three- and four particle interactions, provide the basis for many particle hydrodynamic simulations.

Van Saarloos' work on propagating fronts on a number of years culminated in a paper together with Ebert in which they derived the universal asymptotic behavior of a large class of fronts – so-called pulled fronts—propagating into an unstable state. The review van Saarloos wrote on this type of fronts propagation, which occurs in many disciplines in the natural sciences, is his most highly cited paper. Together with Hohenberg he worked in particular on the classification of coherent structures (fronts, pulses sources and sinks) in the one-dimensional complex Ginzburg-Landau equation and its generalizations, which is the proper amplitude equation for traveling wave pattern forming systems.

With Varma and Nussinov, van Saarloos reviewed the variety of ways in which Landau Fermi liquids can break down, giving rise to singular behavior. Together with Morozov, van Saarloos predicted that viscoelastic Poiseuile flow in a straight channel would exhibit a nonlinear instability at low Reynolds numbers and high Weissenberg numbers. The predicted instability was later experimentally observed. Together with van Hecke and several coworkers van Saarloos contributed to the understanding of force distributions in static granular packings and of the jamming transition in granular media.

Van Saarloos was co-editor of the book Dynamical Heterogeneities in Glasses, Colloids, and Granular Media in which he surveyed the theoretical and experimental research that deals with glassy physics and wrote the textbook Soft Matter: concepts, phenomena and applications together with Vitelli and Zeravcic, which is supported by the website softmatterbook.online.

=== The Dutch Polder Model in science and research ===
In a significant essay together with his predecessor as academy president, van Saarloos highlighted how research and education together have led to the success of this small country becoming a key player in the world of science and research. They also discussed how little is being invested in its research base and how this, together with increased international competition and increasing student numbers, erodes these trusted foundations. The authors then made suggestions about the ways in which the country can recover and relish in their big successes while making sure that research plays a big part in their nation's future.

== Awards and honors ==
- 1982- Shell travel award, Royal Dutch
- 1995-Center of Excellence award, Shell Research
- 1999-Franco-Hollandais Descartes-Huygens Prize for French-Dutch collaboration
- 2004-Member of the Royal Netherlands Academy of Arts and Sciences (KNAW)
- 2007-Fellow of the American Physical Society
- 2008-Physica Prize
- 2008-Elected Outstanding Referee, American Physical Society
- 2008-Knight in the Order of the Netherlands Lion
- 2012-Elisabeth Parvé Steyn prize
- 2013-Honorary member Vereniging voor Technische Physica
- 2017-Member of the Academia Europaea
- 2021-Honorary doctorate of the University of Twente

== Bibliography ==
=== Books ===
- Dynamical Heterogeneities in Glasses, Colloids, and Granular Media (2011) ISBN 9780191621918

=== Selected articles ===
- van Saarloos, W., & Hohenberg, P. C. (1992). Fronts, pulses, sources and sinks in generalized complex Ginzburg-Landau equations. Physica D: Nonlinear Phenomena, 56(4), 303-367.
- Ebert, U., & van Saarloos, W. (2000). Front propagation into unstable states: universal algebraic convergence towards uniformly translating pulled fronts. Physica D: Nonlinear Phenomena, 146(1-4), 1-99.
- Varma, C. M., Nussinov, Z., & van Saarloos, W. (2002). Singular or non-Fermi liquids. Physics Reports, 361(5-6), 267-417.
- van Saarloos, W. (2003). Front propagation into unstable states. Physics Reports, 386(2-6), 29-222.
- Morozov, A. N. & van Saarloos, W. (2007). An introductory essay on subcritical instabilities and the transition to turbulence in visco-elastic parallel shear flows, Phys. Rep. 447, 112-143.
