= Peer instruction =

Teaching method

Peer instruction is a teaching method popularized by Harvard Professor Eric Mazur in the early 1990s. Originally used in introductory undergraduate physics classes at Harvard University, peer instruction is used in various disciplines and institutions around the globe. It is a student-centered learning approach that involves flipping the traditional classroom. It expects students to prepare for class by exploring provided materials and then engage with a series of questions about the material in class.

== Method ==
Peer instruction as a learning system works by moving information transfer out and moving information assimilation, or application of learning, into the classroom. Students prepare to learn outside of class by doing pre-class readings and answering questions about those readings using another method, called Just in Time Teaching. Then, in class, the instructor engages students by posing prepared conceptual questions or ConcepTests that are based on student difficulties. The questioning procedure outlined by Eric Mazur is as follows:

1. Instructor poses question based on students' responses to their pre-class reading
2. Students reflect on the question
3. Students commit to an individual answer
4. Instructor reviews student responses
5. Students discuss their thinking and answers with their peers
6. Students then commit again to an individual answer
7. The instructor again reviews responses and decides whether more explanation is needed before moving on to the next concept.

Peer instruction has been used in a range of educational contexts around the globe and in many disciplines, including philosophy, psychology, geology, mathematics, computer science and engineering.

== Effectiveness ==
There is some research that supports the effectiveness of peer instruction over more traditional teaching methods, such as traditional lecture. The effectiveness of peer instruction can depend on prior student knowledge. A randomized controlled trial published in 2021 found no difference in total test scores for one laboratory exercise compared to traditional group work.
