= Augusto Righi =

Italian physicist (1850–1920)

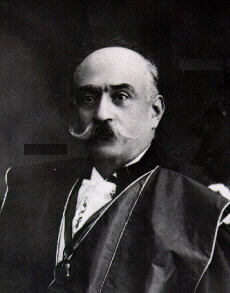
- Born: 27 August 1850; Bologna, Papal States
- Died: 8 June 1920 (aged 69); Bologna, Emilia-Romagna, Kingdom of Italy
- Known for: Righi–Leduc effect; Microwaves
- Awards: Matteucci Medal (1882); Hughes Medal (1905)
- Scientific career
- Fields: Electromagnetism
- Workplaces: University of Palermo (1880–1885); University of Padua (1885–1889); University of Bologna (1889–1920)

Augusto Righi (Italian: [auˈgusto ˈrigi]; 27 August 1850 – 8 June 1920) was an Italian physicist who was one of the first scientists to produce microwaves.

== Biography ==
Born in 1850 in Bologna, Righi was educated in his hometown, taught physics at Bologna Technical College between 1873 and 1880, and left to take up the newly established chair of physics at the University of Palermo. He was a professor of physics at the University of Padua (1885–1889) and later returned to a professorship at the University of Bologna, where he remained until his death in 1920.

== Research ==
His early research, conducted in Bologna between 1872 and 1880, was primarily in electrostatics. He invented an induction electrometer in 1872, capable of detecting and amplifying small electrostatic charges, formulated mathematical descriptions of vibrational motion, and discovered magnetic hysteresis in 1880. Whilst an ordinary professor in physics at the University of Palermo, he studied the conduction of heat and electricity in bismuth. From 1885 to 1889 in Padua, he studied the photoelectric effect. Towards the end of 1889, he was called to the University of Bologna, his home city, where he worked for the rest of his life on subjects such as the Zeeman effect, X-rays, magnetism and the results of Michelson's experiments.

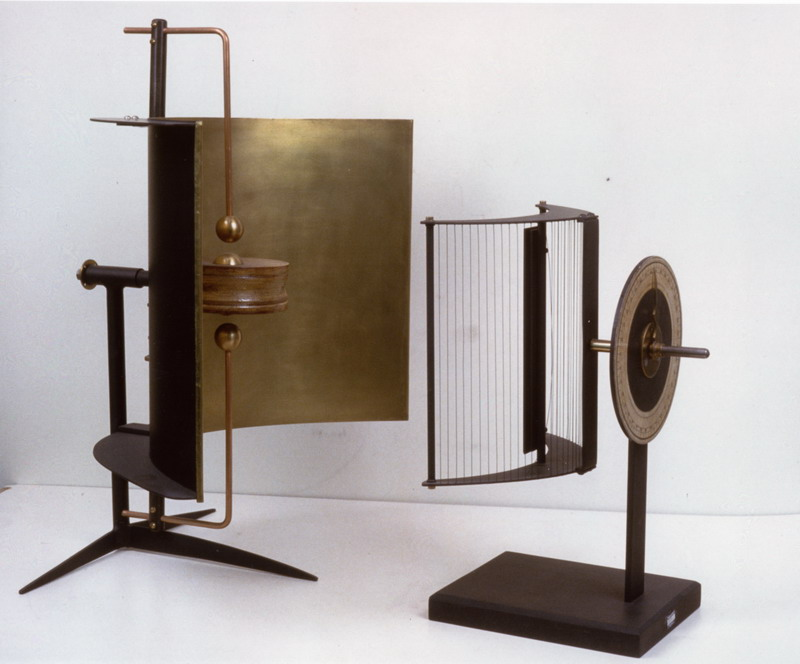
Replica of metal ball microwave spark transmitter (left) and coherer detector Righi used in his experiments.

His most well-known work is his 1890s investigations of Hertzian waves (radio waves), which had been discovered in 1887. In 1894 Righi (along with Indian physicist Jagadish Chandra Bose) was the first person to generate microwaves, producing 12 GHz microwaves with a metal ball spark oscillator, and detecting them with a dipole antenna and spark gap. He used his spark transmitter and detector at wavelengths of 20, 7.5 and 2.5 centimetres (frequencies of 1.5, 4 and 12 GHz) to perform classic optics experiments with microwaves, using quasioptical components, prisms and lenses made of paraffin wax and sulfur and wire diffraction gratings to demonstrate refraction, diffraction, and polarization of these short radio waves, providing experimental confirmation of James Clerk Maxwell's 1873 theory that radio waves and light were both electromagnetic waves, differing only in frequency. His work L'ottica delle oscillazioni elettriche (1897), which summarised his results, is considered a classic of experimental electromagnetism. In 1903 Righi wrote a book on wireless telegraphy.

Righi influenced the young Guglielmo Marconi the inventor of radio, who visited him at his lab. Marconi invented the first practical wireless telegraphy radio transmitters and receivers in 1894 using Righi's four-ball spark oscillator in his transmitters.

By 1900 he had begun to work on X-rays and the Zeeman effect. He also studied gas under various conditions of pressure and ionization, and worked on improvements to the Michelson–Morley experiment from 1918.

== Recognition ==
=== Awards ===
Year	Organization	Award	Citation	Ref.
1882	(Kingdom of Italy) Accademia dei XL	Matteucci Medal		
1905	(United Kingdom of Great Britain and Ireland) Royal Society	Hughes Medal	"For his experimental researches in electrical science, including electric vibrations."	

=== Memberships ===
Year	Organization	Type	Ref.
1887	(Kingdom of Italy) Accademia dei Lincei	National Member	
1907	(United Kingdom of Great Britain and Ireland) Royal Society	Foreign Member	

== Works ==
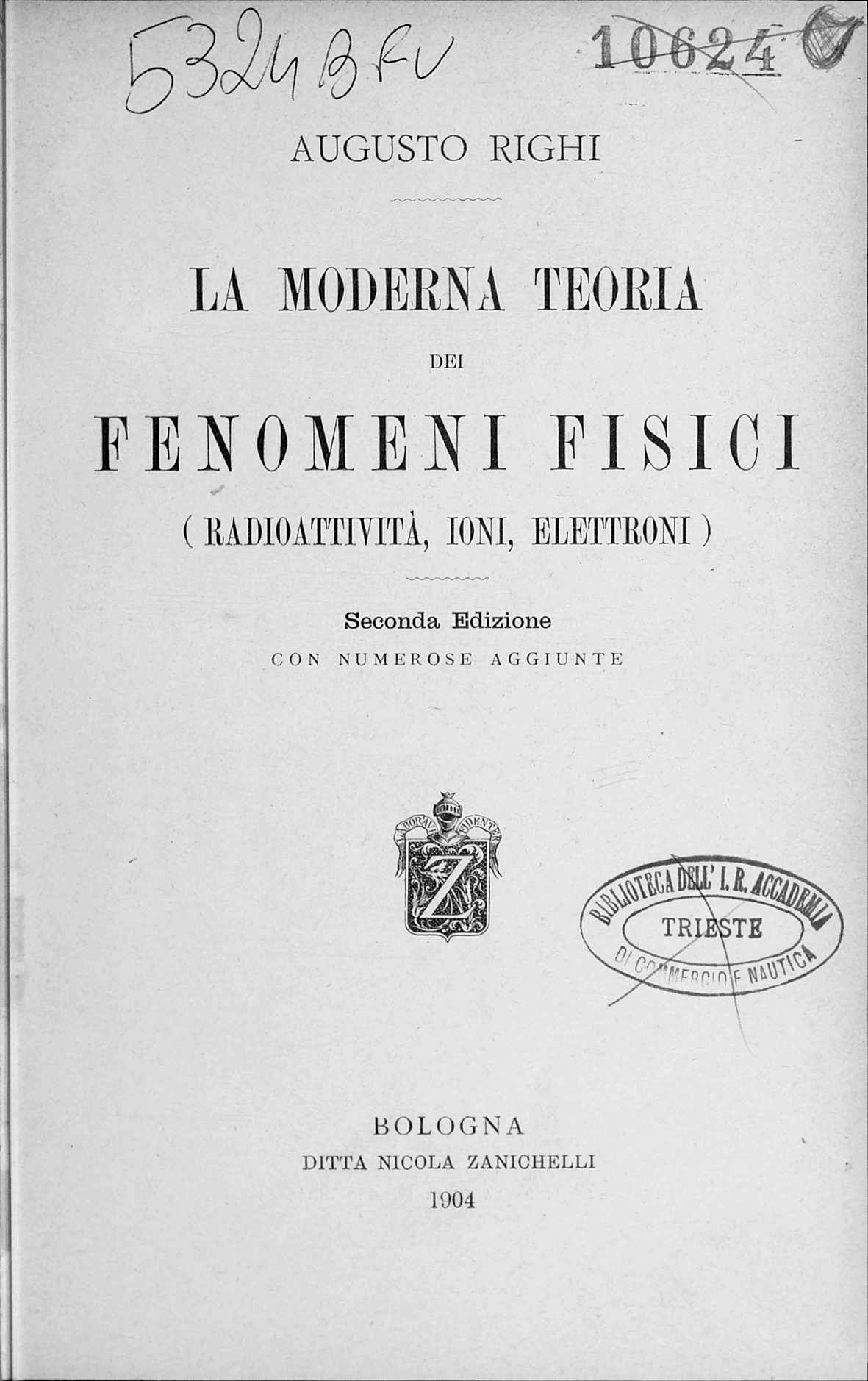
Moderna teoria dei fenomeni fisici, 1904

- Sul principio di Volta (in Italian). Bologna: Gamberini e Parmeggiani. 1873.
- Moto dei ioni nelle scariche elettriche (in Italian). Bologna: Nicola Zanichelli. 1903.
- Radio (in Italian). Bologna: Nicola Zanichelli. 1904.
- Moderna teoria dei fenomeni fisici (in Italian). Bologna: Nicola Zanichelli. 1904.
- Materia radiante e i raggi magnetici (in Italian). Bologna: Nicola Zanichelli. 1909.
- Nuova fisica (in Italian). Bologna: Nicola Zanichelli. 1912.

== See also ==
- Guglielmo Marconi
- Electromagnetism
- Righi–Leduc effect
