= Senftleben–Beenakker effect =

The Senftleben–Beenakker effect is the dependence on a magnetic or electric field of transport properties (such as viscosity and heat conductivity) of polyatomic gases. The effect is caused by the precession of the (magnetic or electric) dipole of the gas molecules between collisions. The resulting rotation of the molecule averages out the nonspherical part of the collision cross-section, if the field is large enough that the precession time is short compared to the time between collisions (this requires a very dilute gas). The change in the collision cross-section, in turn, can be measured as a change in the transport properties.

The magnetic field dependence of the transport properties can also include a transverse component; for example, a heat flow perpendicular to both temperature gradient and magnetic field. This is the molecular analogue of the Hall effect and Righi–Leduc effect for electrons. A key difference is that the gas molecules are neutral, unlike the electrons, so the magnetic field exerts no Lorentz force. An analogous magnetotransverse heat conductivity has been discovered for photons and phonons.

The Senftleben–Beenakker effect owes its name to the physicists Hermann Senftleben (Münster University, Germany) and Jan Beenakker (Leiden University, The Netherlands), who discovered it, respectively, for paramagnetic gases (such as NO and O_{2}) and diamagnetic gases (such as N_{2} and CO). The change in the transport properties is smaller in a diamagnetic gas, because the magnetic moment is not intrinsic (as it is in a paramagnetic gas), but induced by the rotation of a nonspherical molecule. The importance of the effect is that it provides information on the angular dependence of the intermolecular potential. The theory to extract that information from transport measurements is based on the Waldmann–Snider equation (a quantum mechanical version of the Boltzmann equation for gases with rotating molecules). The entire field is reviewed in a two-volume monograph.

== See also ==
- Kinetic theory
- Thermal Hall effect
