= Eric Mazur =

Dutch-born American physicist

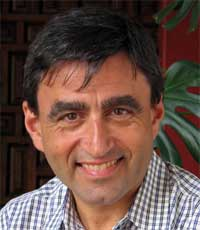
- Eric Mazur in 2004
- Born: November 14, 1954 (age 71); Amsterdam, Netherlands
- Education: Leiden University (PhD)
- Known for: Peer Instruction; Black silicon
- Awards: Presidential Young Investigator Award (1988); Esther Hoffman Beller Medal (2008)
- Scientific career
- Fields: Optical physics Nanophotonics
- Workplaces: Harvard University
- Thesis: The structure of non-equilibrium angular momentum polarizations in polyatomic gases (1981)
- Doctoral advisor: Jan Beenakker
- Doctoral students: Ka Yee Christina Lee
- Website: ericmazur.com

Eric Mazur (born November 14, 1954) is a Dutch-born American physicist and educator at Harvard University, and an entrepreneur in technology start-ups for the educational and technology markets. Mazur's research is in experimental ultrafast optics, condensed matter physics and peer instruction. Born in Amsterdam, Netherlands, he received his undergraduate and graduate degrees from Leiden University. He served as the President of Optica (formerly the Optical Society) in 2017.

== Education ==
Mazur studied physics and astronomy at Leiden University. He passed his "doctoraal examen" (equivalent to a master's degree) in 1977 and continued his graduate studies at the same institution. His PhD thesis investigated the structure of non-equilibrium angular momentum polarizations in polyatomic gases.

== Career and research ==
Although he intended to go on to a career in industry with Philips N.V. in Eindhoven, he left Europe at the urging of his father, Peter Mazur, to pursue a postdoctoral study with Nobel laureate Nicolaas Bloembergen at Harvard University. After two years as a postdoctoral researcher working with Bloembergen, Mazur was offered a position of assistant professor at Harvard University. In 1987 he was promoted to associate professor and obtained tenure three years later in 1990. Mazur currently holds a chair as Balkanski Professor of Physics and Applied Physics jointly in the Harvard School of Engineering and Applied Sciences and in the Physics Department. He was Dean of Applied Physics from 2010 to 2021 and Academic Dean for Applied Science and Engineering from 2021 to 2024. Mazur served as President of Optica (formerly the Optical Society) in 2017 and serves as Chair of the Board of Directors of the Optica Foundation since 2021.

Mazur's early work at Harvard focused on the use of short-pulse lasers to carry out spectroscopy of highly vibrationally excited molecules. Mazur and his group have made many pioneering contributions to the field of ultrashort laser pulses and their interactions with matter ("femtosecond material science"). In 1989 his group was one of the first in academia to build a colliding-pulse mode-locked laser, which generated pulses of only 70 femtosecond duration. After early measurements by Mazur's group demonstrated conclusively that solids can undergo a structural phase transition without appreciable heating of the lattice, Mazur's group developed a technique to measure the full dielectric function of highly excited semiconductors. Since then the group's use of this technique and various nonlinear optical probes to study laser-induced structural phase transitions.

In parallel to the work on semiconductors, Mazur began studying the interaction of intense femtosecond pulses with transparent materials. By tightly focusing a laser pulse in the bulk of a transparent material nonlinear optical absorption occurs inside the material, leading to extreme high temperatures and material changes at the focus. This femtosecond laser micromachining technique is now widely used for data storage, fabrication of integrated optical components, and microsurgery.

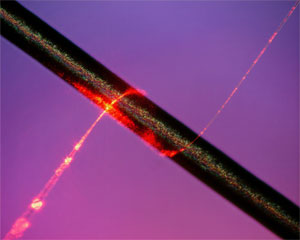
A light-conducting silica nanowire wraps a beam of light around a strand of human hair. The nanowire is about one-thousandth the width of the hair. Credit: Limin Tong, Harvard University

In 1998 a serendipitous discovery in Mazur's laboratory led to the development of a new method to form a silicon surface modification, called "black silicon" because of its very low reflectivity. After irradiation by a train of femtosecond laser pulses in the presence of a halogen containing gas, the surface of silicon develops a self-organized microscopic structure of micrometer-sized cones. The resulting material has many remarkable properties, such as an enhanced absorption that extends to the infrared below the band gap of silicon. The material has found commercial applications in a number of photodetectors.

Mazur's research continues to focus on optics and photonics and the fabrication of novel nonlinear optical devices. In collaboration with a group from Zhejiang University in Hangzhou, China, Mazur's group was the first to develop a technique for pulling subwavelength diameter silica optical fibers. These wires guide light in the form of an evanescent wave, permit very sharp bending of the light. Currently his research group works on fabricating optical metamaterials that exhibit optical properties that do not occur in nature.

=== Peer instruction ===
In 1991, Mazur began designing an instructional strategy for teaching called peer instruction. In 1997, he published a book called Peer Instruction: A User's Manual which provides details on this strategy.

Peer Instruction (PI) has been found to be more beneficial than class-wide discussion or lecture. In fact, according to an article in the March/April 2009 edition of Complexity, over 90% of instructors who have tried PI plan to continue to use it and incorporate it more into teaching. The seating arrangement plays an important role in the outcome of this method. For example, when low-performing students are seated in the front, their chance to do better increases. Meanwhile, the results of high-performing students who are seated in the back are not affected. In addition, when high-performing students are seated in the outer four corners of the classroom, the performance of the class as a whole increases.

Assessment: The Silent Killer of Learning

Through his famous lecturing tour in Europe, the US and other continents, Mazur became famous in the fields of Learning Sciences and Educational Psychology for his firm evidence given that many types of assessments are harmful to students and assessments should be reduced and replaced by 'dialogic feedback'. Only real feedback could lead to so-called 'high impact learning that lasts'. Mazur explained in his tour that 'Assessment kills learning'. Many hours of video footage of his lecture are available on Youtube when searching for 'The silent killer of learning' by Eric Mazur.

=== Entrepreneurship ===
Mazur has founded or co-founded three technology start-ups: SiOnyx, which makes infrared sensors, and Learning Catalytics, which in April 2013 he sold to the Pearson educational corporation. In 2015 Mazur co-founded the social learning platform Perusall.

=== Awards and honors ===
Mazur has been widely recognized for his scientific work and leadership.

- 1988 – Awarded the Presidential Young Investigator Award by President Ronald Reagan.
- 1989 – Elected a Fellow of the American Physical Society.
- 1999 – Award for excellence in educational research by the Council of Scientific Society Presidents
- 2006 – selected as one of 75 most outstanding American physicists by the American Association of Physics Teachers
- 2008 – Awarded the Esther Hoffman Beller Medal by the Optical Society of America and elected a Fellow of that Society
- 2008 - Correspondent of the Royal Netherlands Academy of Arts and Sciences
- 2014 - Minerva Prize for Advancement in Higher Education by Minerva University
