= Isabelle Archinard =

Swiss scientist (1903–1995)

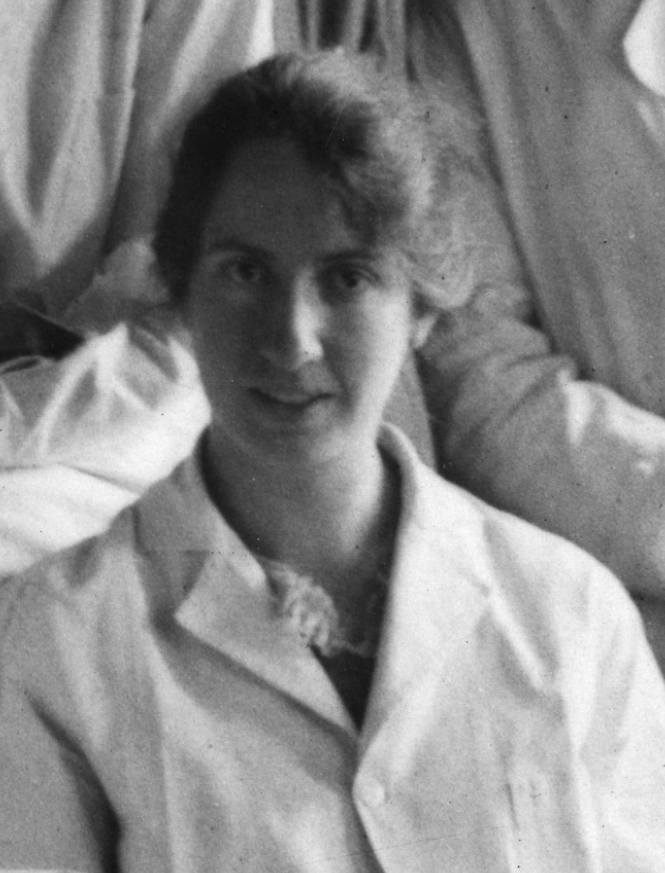
- Born: Marie-Isabelle Archinard; 27 February 1903; Troinex, Canton of Geneva, Switzerland
- Died: 28 April 1995 (aged 92); Carouge, Canton of Geneva, Switzerland
- Education: University of Geneva
- Known for: Ultra-violet X-ray spectrum, radiochemical distillation
- Scientific career
- Fields: Physics, mathematics
- Thesis: Contribution à l’étude dynamique de l’amalgamation
- Doctoral advisor: Charles-Eugène Guye

Marie-Isabelle Archinard, commonly known as Isabelle Archinard, (27 February 1903 — 28 April 1995) was a Swiss scientist who earned her doctorate at the University of Geneva in 1929. She joined Marie Curie's laboratory at the Radium Institute in Paris in early 1930 where she undertook research on the ultra-violet X-ray spectrum and fluorescence. She worked there for the next two years, also collaborating with Paul Bonét-Maury on radiochemical distillation. She then returned to Switzerland, teaching in private institutions in Geneva. In the late 1940s, she became active in a number of human rights organizations, including Pax Romana. In 1967, she attended a dinner with several of those she had worked with in Marie Curie's laboratory.

== Early life and education ==
Marie-Isabelle Archinard was born on 27 February 1903 at Troinex in the Swiss Canton of Geneva. The eldest of the family's three children, she was the daughter of the estate manager Alfred Archinard and his wife Henriette née Bourdanchon. After completing her secondary education in Geneva, she attended the University of Geneva, graduating in physics in 1923 and earning a doctorate in 1929 with a thesis titled "Contribution à l’étude dynamique de l’amalgamation" (Contribution to the Dynamic Study of Amalgamation)" under the guidance of Charles-Eugène Guye who collaborated with the Curie laboratory.

== Career ==
Thanks to both Guye and his student Jean d'Espine, Archinard was invited to work in Marie Curie's laboratory in February 1930. Showing particular interest in researching ultra-violet X-ray spectrum and fluorescence, she also requested Curie's help in helping her to obtain a grant. Curie accepted both of these but also invited Archinard to collaborate with Bonnét-Maury on radiochemical distillation, especially in connection with polonium. On 31 May, Curie informed her that she had succeeded in obtaining a Rockefeller fellowship grant for the next academic year but Archinard's mother informed Curie that the family could support the educational costs and that the grant should be kept for someone else.

Archinard worked in Curie's laboratory for the next two years. In a letter to her mother, Marie Curie stated: "Miss Archinard has made a very good impression on me; she seems very serious and intelligent".

In September 1932, Archinard left the laboratory and returned to Geneva where she first continued her research at the Physics Institute of the University of Geneva under the supervision of Jean Weigde. In particular, Weigde asked Marie Curie if Archinard could continue her research into polonium distillation by making a short visit to the Paris laboratory and bringing a sample of polonium back to Geneva. These arrangements were accepted by Marie Curie but on returning to Geneva, Archinard did not find the conditions suitable for continuing her research and shortly afterwards decided to return to teaching.

She taught mathematics and English at the Sainte-Marie de Genève day school and as a substitute teacher at the secondary school for girls now known as the Collège Voltaire. In the 1940s, she became involved in various humanitarian associations, especially Roman Catholic organizations interested in women's suffrage. After both her parents died in the late 1940s, she worked as a linguist as United Nations meetings and became active in supporting human rights with Pax Romana.

In 1967, she accepted an invitation to dine with former colleagues from the Curie laboratory as part of the centenary celebrations of Marie Curie's birth. She was therefore able to renew associations with Branca Edmée Marques, Marthe Leblanc, Elisabeth Korvezee and several others.

Marie-Isabelle Archinard died in a Roman Catholic old people's home at Carouge in the Canton of Geneva on 18 April 1995.

== See also ==
- List of women associated with Marie Curie and Irène Joliot-Curie
