= Lucienne Wisner =

French physicist (1903–1940)

- Born: Lucienne Weinbach; February 10, 1903; Paris, France
- Died: January 19, 1940 (aged 36)
- Education: University of Paris
- Spouse: André Wisner (m. 1924)
- Scientific career
- Fields: Physics
- Workplaces: Curie laboratory

Lucienne Wisner (née Weinbach; 1903–1940) was a French physicist who worked in Marie Curie's laboratory from 1923 to 1925 under the supervision of Irène Joliot-Curie. Suffering from psychiatric problems, Wisner took her own life in January 1940.

== Early life ==
Born on 10 February 1903 in Paris, Lucienne Weibach was the daughter of the successful textile businessman Henry Weisbach and his wife Yvonne Jacob. Brought up in a prosperous Jewish family, she was the first of the family's three children.

== Career ==
After studying in the science faculty at the University of Paris, she graduated in 1923 and entered Marie Curie's laboratory as she prepared for her DES qualification (Diplôme d'études supérieures spécialisées). Her mentor was Irène Curie who, after commenting on her successful progress, accuracy and personal creativeness, placed her second among the students performing practical work that year.

On 29 October 1924, shortly before the beginning of the academic year, she married André Wisner who was closely connected to the Rothschild family. Shorty after her wedding, Lucienne re-registered at the Curie laboratory, this time as Lucienne Wisner and remained there for the full 1924–1925 academic year.

On 13 December 1925, she gave birth to twins but only one, Jean-François, survived. On 12 August 1925, a daughter, Annette, was born. After taking care of the children for a number of years, she began to work again in 1938, now as an employee of Galeries Lafayette purchasing fashion accessories. But she was not happy and soon developed psychological problems. She consulted the psychoanalyst Jacques Lacan who was optimistic about her future. Nevertheless, on 19 January 1940, she took her own life, shooting herself with her husband's pistol.

She was not to know that apart from her daughter Annette, the other members of her family were murdered by the Nazi occupiers.

== See also ==
- List of women associated with Marie Curie and Irène Joliot-Curie
