= Marie Henriette Wibratte =

French physicist (1911–1944)

- Born: July 3, 1911; Arras, France
- Died: 1944
- Scientific career
- Fields: Physics
- Workplaces: Curie laboratory

Marie Henriette Wibratte (1911–1944) was a French physicist who worked in the laboratory of Marie Curie for a short period beginning in 1931. In 1933, with Curie's support, she earned a specialized diploma in physics on the basis of her thesis "Étude du rayonnement gamma émis par des radioéléments de la famille de l'actinium", which discussed the radiation of radioelements in the actinium series.

== Early life ==
Born in Arras on 3 July 1911, Marie Henriette Wibratte was the daughter of Charles Wibratte, an army captain who died from war injuries on 16 February 1915. The four-year-old was then brought up by her uncle, Louis Marius Laurent Wibratte (1877–1954), an engineer and successful businessman.

== Career ==
By 1931, now living in Paris, Wibratte had graduated in science with four diplomas: chemistry, physics, mathematics, chemistry-physics and radiology. She joined Marie Curie's laboratory in 1931 while preparing for her Diplôme d'études supérieures spécialisées in physics. There was no need for a grant as her uncle took care of all the costs. On the basis of a thesis titled "Étude du rayonnement gamma émis par des radioéléments de la famille de l'actinium" (Study of gamma radiation emitted by radioisotopes in the actinium series), she earned the qualification in the summer of 1933. Marie Curie complemented Wibratte on her efforts, commenting "In her work, Miss Wibratte has revealed a high level of care and thoughtfulness."

According to her registration at the Curie Institute, Marie Henriette Wibratte died in 1944. It contains no details of her life following her diploma in 1933.

== See also ==
- List of women associated with Marie Curie and Irène Joliot-Curie
