= Sonja Hanneborg =

Norwegian scientist (1902–1998)

- Born: Sonja Dedichen; November 14, 1902; Modum, Norway
- Died: January 15, 1998 (aged 95)
- Education: University of Oslo
- Spouse: Øystein Hanneborg (m. 1927; died 1964)
- Children: 3
- Scientific career
- Fields: Chemistry
- Workplaces: Curie laboratory; Norwegian Institute of Marine Research

Sonja Hanneborg, née Dedichen (1902–1998), Norwegian scientist and student of Ellen Gleditsch who worked in the laboratory of Marie Curie in 1924. Curie invited her to stay for another year but she returned to Norway and married the medical doctor Østein Hanneborg with whom she had three children. From 1935 to 1938 she worked in Gleditsch's laboratory in Norway. In 1969, aged 60, she collaborated with Ernst Foyn at the Norwegian Institute of Marine Research publishing papers until 1971.

== Early life and education ==
Born in Modum near Oslo on 14 November 1902, Sonja Dedichen was the daughter of the physician Lucien Dedichen and his wife Sonja née Bettum. On graduating from the University of Oslo in 1921 in astronomy and chemistry, she began in work in the laboratory of her mentor, Ellen Gleditsch.

== Career ==
In December 1924, Gleditsch wrote to Marie Curie asking whether she could find a place for Dedichen in her laboratory as she was "serious, intelligent and friendly — perhaps too friendly". Curie was unable to take her on immediately but she invited Dedichen to join the laboratory in the autumn of 1925. As a result, Dedichen worked together with Sonia Cotelle until May 2026 when she returned to Norway.

Curie was so keen for her to spend another year at the laboratory that she wrote to Gliditsch several times, asking her to do everything possible to persuade Dedicher to return to Paris. It all came to nothing as while on holiday in Norway, she met a young medical student, Øystein Hanneborg, who refused to let her go. She later explained, "He did not want to hear any talk about me going to Paris and him staying at home being engaged to a young woman doing research in Paris." She wrote to Curie explaining that her circumstances had changed and she would not be spending another year in the laboratory. Curie replied, wishing her all the best in her marriage and a happy future.

They married in 1927 and had three children together.

In 1935, Sonja Hanneborg worked once again in Gleditsch's laboratory, this time collaborating with the chemist and oceanographer Ermst Føyn. Her husband however contracted tuberculosis and in 1938 she left Gleditsch to care for him. She spent the next 30 years looking after him until his death in August 1964. She then contacted her old friend Ernst Føyn who in the late 1069s invited her to join his research group at the Norwegian Institute of Marine Research. She collaborated with him for 15 years until she was 80 when Føyn himself retired. She carried out research on photosynthesis and developed a method to show the amount of carbon-14 in liquids. She published her last paper with Føyn in 1971.

Sonja Hanneborg died on 15 January 1998, aged 95.

== See also ==
- List of women associated with Marie Curie and Irène Joliot-Curie
