= Hélène Emmanuel-Zavizziano =

Greek chemical engineer (1908-1990)

- Born: 17 October 1906 or 1908; Corfu, Greece
- Died: 1990
- Education: University of Paris
- Spouse: Henri Frank Emmanuel (m. 1935)
- Children: 1
- Scientific career
- Fields: Chemical engineering
- Workplaces: Curie Institute; Commissariat à l'Énergie Atomique

Hélène Emmanuel-Zavizziano (Greek: Ζαβιτσιάνος, 1906/1908–1990) was a Greek chemical engineer who worked in Marie Curie's laboratory from 1933 to 1941. She later participated in the Zoé nuclear reactor project under the Commissariat à l'Énergie Atomique (CEA).

== Early life ==
Born in Corfu to Mr and Mrs. Cristo Zavizziano on 17 October 1906 or 1908, Hélène Zavizziano arrived in France in 1926 to study science at the University of Paris. In 1933, on the advice of Sonia Cotelle, she joined Marie Curie's laboratory to prepare a thesis on radioactivity.

In July 1936, physicist Paul Langevin presented a paper at the Academy of Sciences on The electrolysis of titanium salt solutions by Emmanuel-Zavizziano and Moïse Haissinsky, her colleague at the Curie Institute. At the time, Emmanuel-Zavizziano was on a short maternity break.

== Research ==
In 1967, in connection with the centenary of Marie Curie's birth, Hélène Emmanuel-Zavizziano reported in an interview for UNESCO that despite initial concerns, she had found Curie very friendly as she worked closely with her on experiments with protactinium. Curie's aim was to see whether it was possible to use titanium to separate it from other elements. Emmanuel-Zavizziano explained that working with Curie, she "experienced support and guidance while after her disappearance I felt helpless".

After the end of the Second World War, she worked as an engineer in the radioelements department of the CEA in connection with the development of the Zoé reactor. She explained that it was difficult to provide the required results within half a percentage point as the presence of foreign materials upset everything.

== Personal life ==
In October 1935, she was married to the chemical engineer Henri Frank Emmanuel (1907–1998), son of Maurice Emmanuel, in her native Corfu by Leonard Brindisi, Archbishop of Corfu, Zakynthos and Cephalonia. A year later, she gave birth to a daughter but after taking leave from the laboratory in June 1936, she was already back at work the following October.

Her mother died in Paris in 1953 and the family held the funeral at St. Stephen's Greek Orthodox Cathedral.

Hélène Emmanuel-Zavazziano died in 1990.

== See also ==
- List of women associated with Marie Curie and Irène Joliot-Curie
