= Branca Edmée Marques =

Portuguese radiochemist (1899–1986)

- Born: 14 April 1899; Lisbon, Portugal,
- Died: 19 July 1986 (aged 87); Lisbon, Portugal
- Education: University of Lisbon; University of Paris at Sorbonne
- Spouse: António Silva Sousa Torres
- Scientific career
- Fields: Radiology
- Doctoral advisor: Marie Curie

Branca Edmée Marques de Sousa Torres (14 April 1899 - 19 July 1986) was a Portuguese specialist in the peaceful applications of nuclear technology. She earned a doctorate in Paris under the guidance of Marie Curie. Returning to Lisbon she founded the Radiochemistry Laboratory, where she continued her research for three decades. In 1966, she became the first woman to hold a chair in chemistry at a Portuguese university.

== Early life and education ==
Branca Edmée Marques was born in Lisbon on 14 April 1899 to Berta Rosa Marques and Alexandre Théodor Roux. Her father died when she was just eight years old. Her mother ensured that she received a good education. After high school she attended the University of Lisbon where she graduated in Physics and Chemistry from the Faculty of Sciences.

== Career ==
Having turned down a chance to do geological work in Angola, she taught at the faculty after her graduation in 1926, where she was the only woman carrying out teaching or research in chemistry. She married António Silva Sousa Torres (1876-1958), professor at the Faculty of Sciences of the University of Lisbon, but only on condition that she could go to Paris to study for a Doctorate.

Wishing to specialize in radioactivity, she applied for and received a grant from the National Education Board (Portuguese: Junta de Educação Nacional) to study in 1931–32 at the Radium Institute in Paris (now the Curie Institute) on radioactivity topics. At her husband's request she was accompanied by her mother. Impressed by Marques’ work, Curie wrote favorable reviews at the request of the Portuguese government in 1932, and at frequent intervals after that, so that Marques' requests for renewals of her funding would be granted. Later, the Institute also found a way to allow her to continue with her research, which was later turned into work on a doctoral thesis.

In her first three years she worked under the guidance of Marie Curie and, in the last year, after Curie's death, under the supervision of André-Louis Debierne. Her notes of classes given by Curie and Debierne form part of her valuable scientific estate. In 1935 she defended her doctoral thesis on Nouvelles recherches sur le fractionnement des sels de baryum radifère (New research on the fragmentation of radiferous barium salts) at the Sorbonne University. With the support of two Nobel Prize winners, Jean Baptiste Perrin and Frédéric Joliot-Curie, her Doctorate was awarded with three honourable mentions, the highest grade possible. She published her results in three articles in 1936 in the Journal de Chimie Physique and published six articles in the Comptes rendus de l'Académie des Sciences of Paris.

Despite being invited to continue her research career in Paris, Marques chose to return to Lisbon and resumed her activity at the Faculty of Sciences, where she developed research in the field of radioactivity. In 1936, she created the Radiochemistry Laboratory, which led, in 1953, to the formation of the Centre for Radiochemistry Studies of the Nuclear Energy Studies Commission. She continued to be the director of the centre until well after her formal retirement from the university.

On her return to Lisbon, Marques had been awarded a Doctorate in Physical-Chemical Sciences, on the strength of her French qualifications. She continued to do research on nuclear chemistry and radiochemistry and on the therapeutic applications of radioisotopes. She published regularly in Portuguese and international journals. However, despite her excellent qualifications, her career progression was relatively slow. The fact that she was a woman in a profession dominated by men appears to have been a major cause of this. She is quoted as saying that men considered it an insult to have to work with women. A contributory factor was that research was not a high priority in her university at that time: the laboratory she established was the first at the university.

She finally became a full professor only in 1966, when she was the first woman to obtain a chair in chemistry at a Portuguese university. Towards the end of her professional life she developed serious problems with her eyesight.

In October 1967, she attended ceremonies in Paris to mark the 100th anniversary of the birth of Marie Curie, including a dinner with other former Curie students including Marthe Leblanc, Elisabeth Korvezee and Marie-Isabelle Archinard.

Branca Edmée Marques died in Lisbon on 19 July 1986 at the age of 87.

== Commemoration ==
In September 2009, Lisbon City Council approved the name Branca Edmée Marques for a street in the university area as a way to honour her achievements.

== See also ==
- List of women associated with Marie Curie and Irène Joliot-Curie
