= List of women associated with Marie Curie and Irène Joliot-Curie =

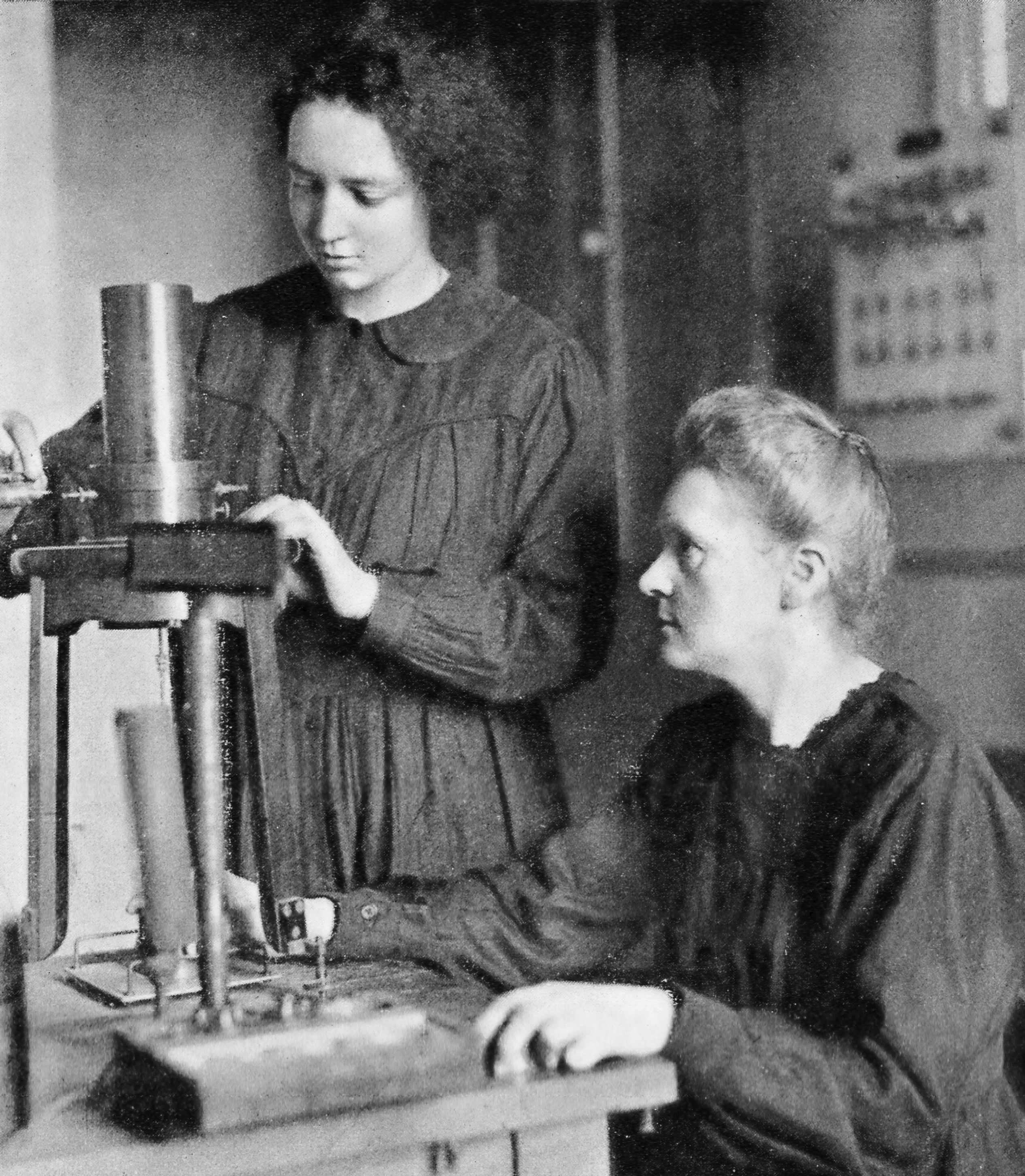
Irene and Marie Curie in 1925

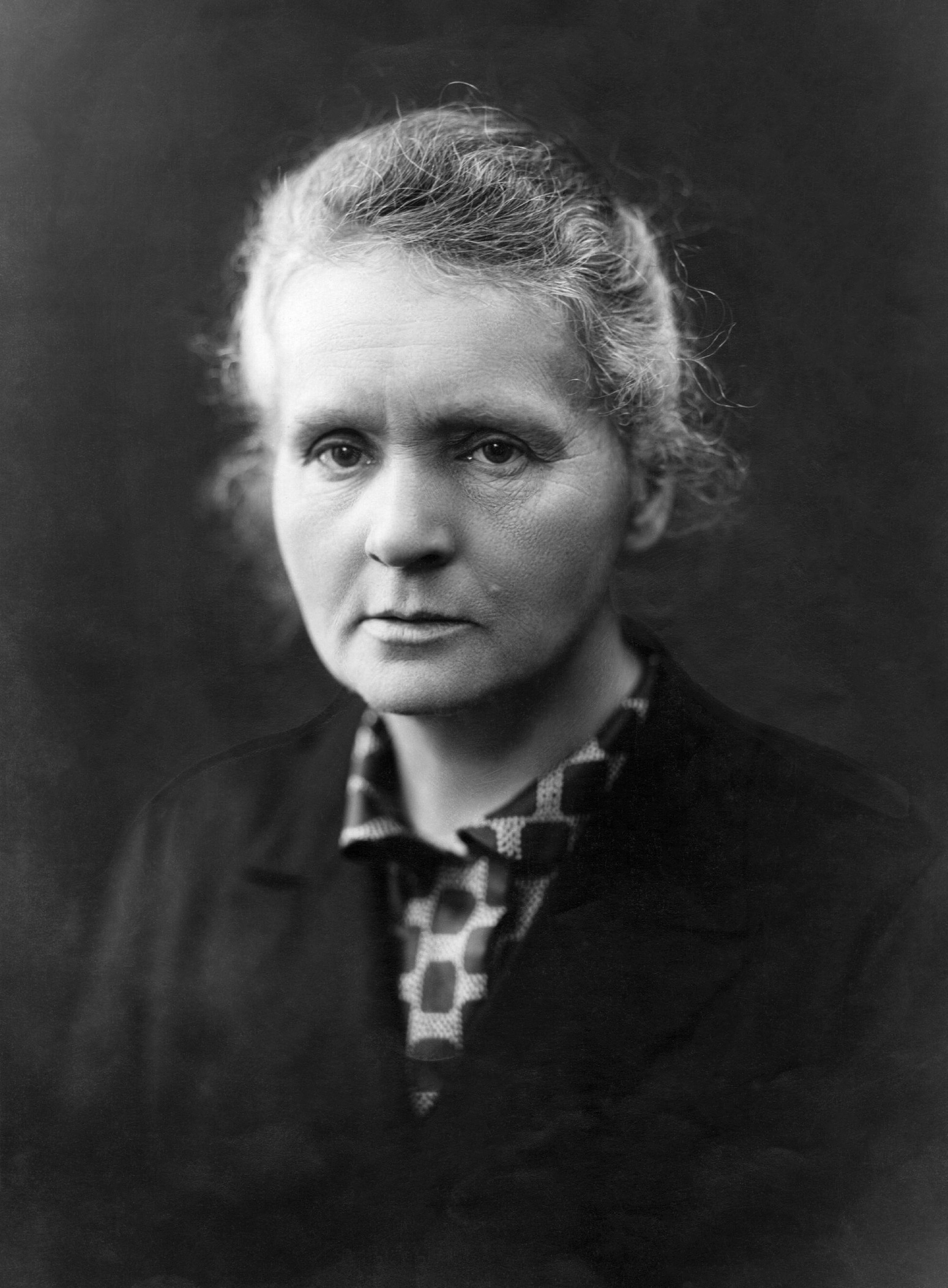
Marie Curie

This is a list of women associated with Marie Curie and her daughter Irène.

In 1904, after the death of her husband, Pierre Curie. Marie Curie headed a new research laboratory in Paris where she initially worked together with Pierre's former collaborators. In view of the considerable amount to work to be undertaken, Marie Curie needed to recruit more researchers, not only men but now also women. The first of these was the Canadian Harriet Brooks who arrived in October 1906. By the time of her death in July 1934, at least 45 women, mainly scientists but also support staff, had worked in the laboratory. Thereafter, the laboratory continued to function with the support of Irène Joliot-Curie who had joined the laboratory in 1918.

== Family ==
- Marie Curie (née Skłodowska, 1867–1934), Polish and naturalised-French physicist and chemist remembered for investigating radioactivity and winning two Nobel prizes
- Irène Joliot-Curie (1897–1956), French chemist and physicist, Nobel Prize in chemistry with her husband for the discovery of induced radioactivity

Marie Curie's second daughter, Ève Curie (1904–2007), was a French and American writer, journalist and pianist. She was not involved in the radioactivity work of Marie Curie and Irène Joliot-Curie.

Marie Curie had three sisters, including the Polish educator Helena Skłodowska-Szalay (1866–1961) and physician Bronisława Dłuska (1865–1939).

Irène Joliot-Curie had a daughter, French physicist Hélène Langevin-Joliot (born 1927).

== Associated women ==
Hertha Ayrton

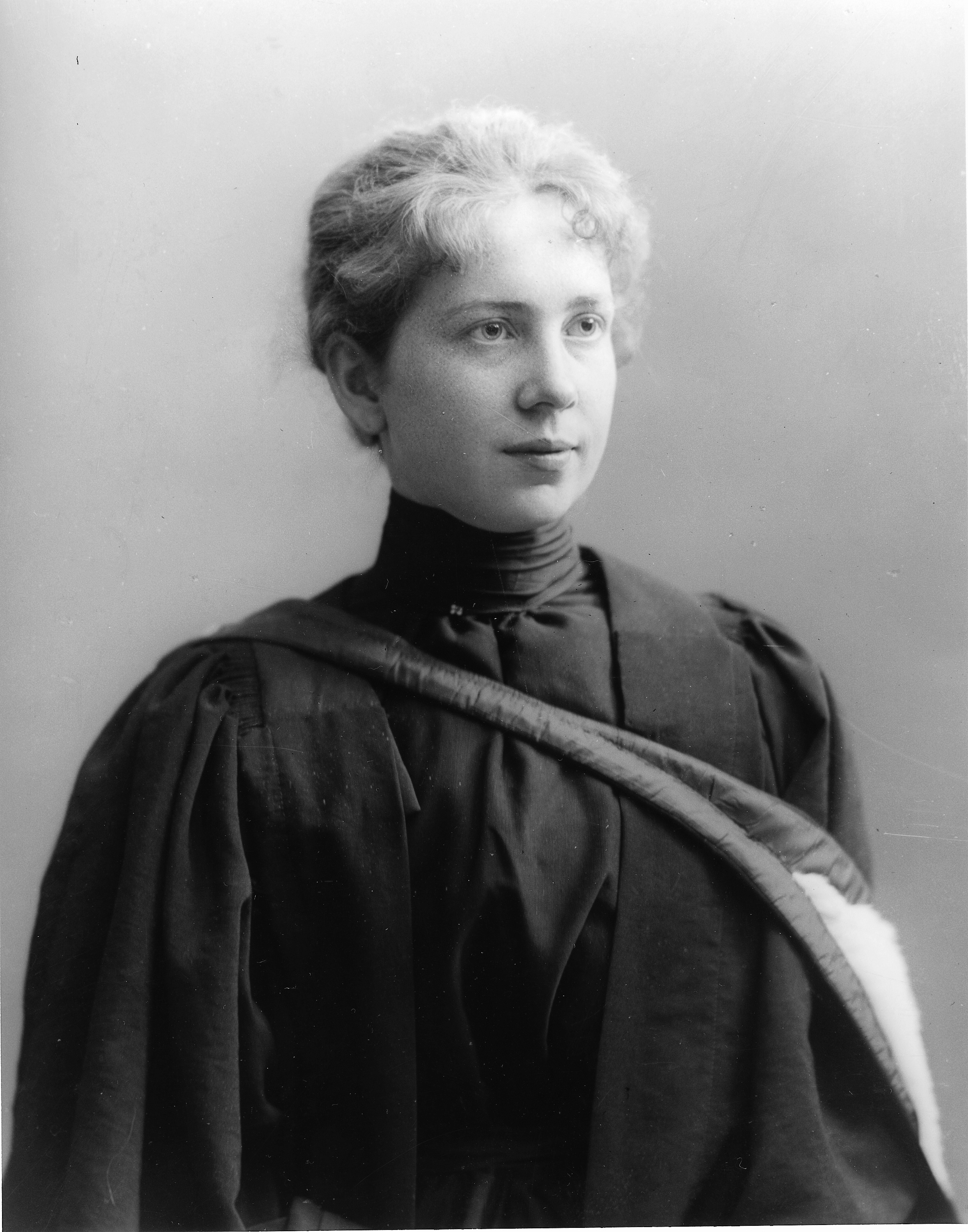
Harriet Brooks

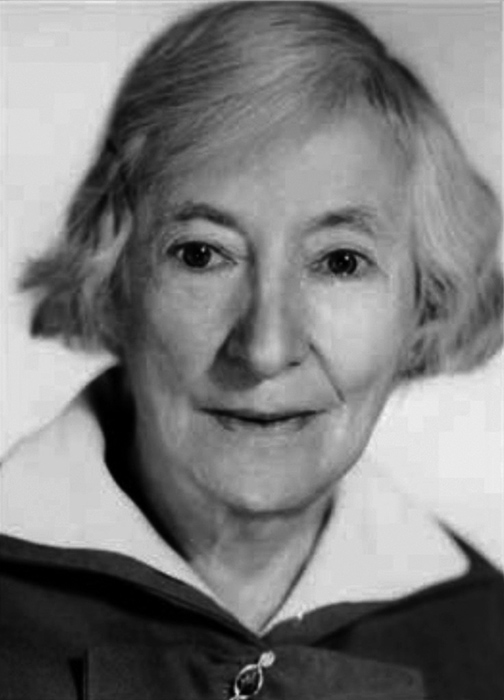
Alicja Dorabialska

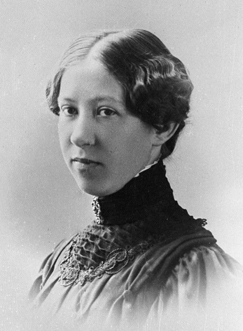
Ellen Gleditsch

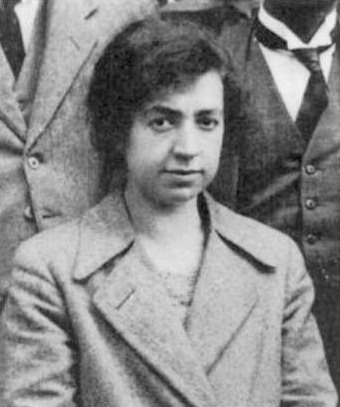
May Sybil Leslie

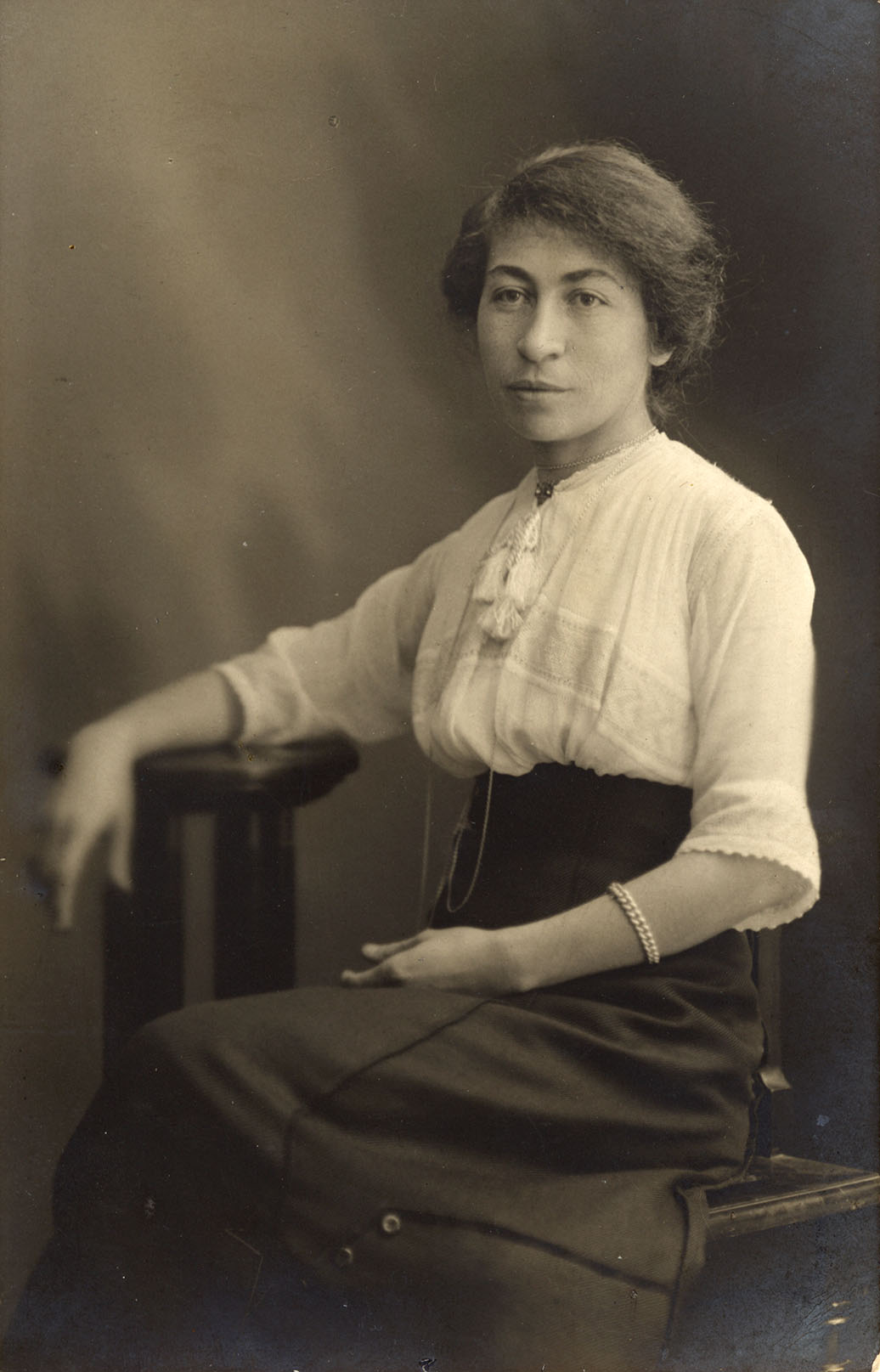
Stefania Mărăcineanu

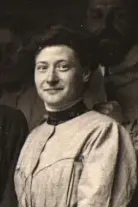
Suzanne Veil

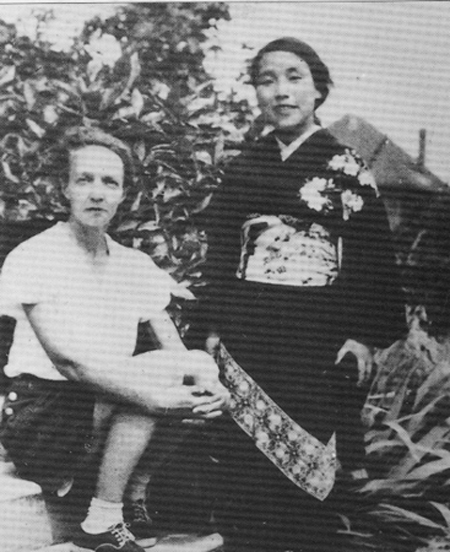
Toshiko Yuasa (right) with Irene Joliot-Curie in Paris

=== Scientists ===
- Isabelle Archinard (1903–1995), Swiss scientist who joined Marie Curie's laboratory at the Radium Institute in Paris in early 1930
- Hertha Ayrton (1854 – 1923), British electrical engineer, mathematician, physicist, inventor and suffragette. She was a friend of Marie Curie and instructed the young Irène in mathematics.
- Lucie Blanquiès (1879–1961), French scientist who worked on measurements in Marie Curie's laboratory in Paris from 1908 to 1910
- Marietta Blau (1894–1970), Austrian physicist who was invited to work with Marie Curie in her laboratory.
- Harriet Brooks (1876–1933), Canadian physicist that worked with Marie Curie in her laboratory.
- Anna Cartan (1878–1923), French mathematician, teacher and textbook author, a student of Marie Curie and Jules Tannery
- Catherine Chamié (1888–1950), French chemist who worked with Irène Joliot-Curie on the half-life of radon and the photographic effect of groupings of atoms
- Sonia Cotelle (née Slobodkine, 1896–1945), Polish radiochemist who worked with Marie Curie at the Institut du Radium in Paris
- Eugénie Cotton (née Feytis, 1881 – 1967), French physicist, peace advocate and part of the French Resistance. Studied physics under Marie Curie from 1901
- Alicja Dorabialska (1897–1975), Polish chemist who studied at Marie Curie's Radium Institute in 1925
- Hélène Emmanuel-Zavizziano, (1908–1990), Greek chemical engineer who worked in Marie Curie's laboratory from 1933 to 1941
- Jeanne Ferrier (1888–1979). French physicist and pioneer in the field of radiotherapy who worked with Marie Curie in the 1920s
- Renée Galabert (1894–1956), French scientist who headed the measurements department in the laboratory of Marie Curie from 1919
- Nicole Girard-Mangin (1878–1919), first female medical doctor to serve in the French Army. Worked in collaboration with Marie Curie during World War I, running a training programme for nurses at the Edith Cavell Hospital in Paris which operated in conjunction with the Radium Institute to train women as radiographers to support the medical needs of the fronts
- Ellen Gleditsch (1879–1968), Norwegian radiochemist and Norway's second female professor who started her career as an assistant to Marie Curie
- Irén Júlia Götz (1889–1940), Hungarian chemist who studied at Marie Curie's Radium Institute in 1911–1912
- Sonja Hanneborg (née Dedichen, 1902–1998), Norwegian scientist who worked in the laboratory of Marie Curie in 1924
- Randi Holwech (1890–1967), Norwegian scientist who undertook research with Marie Curie in 1919 but later turned to art
- Antonia Elisabeth Korvezee (1899–1978), Dutch theoretical chemist specialising in radioactivity who spent two six-month periods working with Marie Curie in the early 1930s
- Alice Leigh-Smith (née Prebil, 1907–1987), Croatian-born physicist who studied under Marie Curie at the Radium Institute
- May Sybil Leslie (1887–1937), English chemist who worked with Marie Curie at the Radium Institute
- Anne Levy-Baschwitz (1913–1997), French physicist who from 1933 spent five years in the Curie laboratory
- Wilhelmina Anna Lub (1900–1986), Dutch physicist who worked closely with Marie Curie on the spectrum of actinium og actinium
- Marguerite Macaigne (1908–2000), French physicist who from 1932 worked in Marie Curie's laboratory in Paris
- Branca Edmée Marques (1899-1986), Portuguese specialist in the peaceful applications of nuclear technology who earned a doctorate under the guidance of Marie Curie
- Ștefania Mărăcineanu (1882–1944), Romanian physicist who worked with Marie Curie on polonium and with Irène Joliot-Curie on induced radioactivity
- Henriette Mathieu-Faraggi (1915–1985), French nuclear physicist known for her contributions to French nuclear research. She began her career with Irène Joliot-Curie.
- Madeleine Molinier (née Monin, 1898–1976), French scientist and nurse who worked with Marie Curie from 1918 to 1921
- Éliane Montel (1898–1993), French physicist and chemist who worked in the Radium Institute from 1926
- Ethel Moustacchi (1933–2016), Egyptian-born French geneticist, a leading figure in molecular biology and radiobiology research who spent most of her career at Curie's Radium Institute
- Marguerite Perey (1909–1975), French physicist who discovered the element francium at the Radium Institute
- Angèle Pompéi (1898–1990), French scientist and friend of Irène Curie who contributed to the Curie laboratory from 1929 until at least 1949.
- Eva Ramstedt (1879–1974), Swedish physicist who specialised in radiology and studied under Marie Curie
- Marthe Renard (née Leblanc, born 1903), French pharmacist who worked in Marie Curie's laboratory from around 1929 to 1932
- Elizabeth Rona (1890–1981), Hungarian nuclear chemist who worked with Irène Joliot-Curie on polonium
- Alice Scouvart (1885–1932), Belgian physicist who studied in Paris under Marie Curie
- Isabelle Stone (1868 – 1966), the only other woman (of 836 attendees) alongside Marie Curie at the first International Congress of Physics in Paris
- Jadwiga Szmidt (1889–1940), Polish-Russian physicist who worked with Marie Curie at the Radium Institute
- María Teresa Toral (1911–1993), Spanish chemist who received support from Irène Joliot-Curie at her trial in 1946
- Suzanne Veil (1886–1956), French chemical engineer known for her research and for training nurses in using radiology to find shrapnel. She began her career working with Maire Curie
- Isabel Jocelyn Waldbauer (née Patton, 1905–1968), Canadian scientist who worked in Marie Curie's laboratory together with her husband in 1927
- Adrienne Weill (Brunschvicg, 1903–1979) French scientist that studied under Marie Curie.
- Marthe Weiss (née Klein, 1885–1953), French scientist and teacher, who introduced Marie Curie to the Mediterranian coast in 1919 and contributed to her laboratory
- Marie Henriette Wibratte (1911–1944), French physicist who worked in the laboratory of Marie Curie for a short period beginning in 1931
- Lucienne Wisner (née Weinbach, 1903–1940), French physicist who worked in Marie Curie's laboratory from 1923 to 1925 under the supervision of Irène Joliot-Curie
- Germaine Wiswald (1891–1988), Swiss engineer who worked with Marie Curie at the Radium Institute where she remained until its closure in 1962
- Margarete von Wrangell (1877 –1932), Baltic German chemist that worked with Marie Curie at the Radium Institute.
- Toshiko Yuasa (1909 – 1980), first female Japanese nuclear physicist. Inspired by Marie Curie, worked with Irène Joliot-Curie, was known as the Japanese Marie Curie.

In addition to the above, in Les femmes du laboratoire de Marie Curie, Natalie Pigeard-Micault briefly mentions four other women: Lithuanian scientist Riva Gurvičaite (known as R. Gourvitch, 1880–1940) who worked in the laboratory for two or three years from 1924, the Polish scientist Janina Garczynska who spent a few months in the laboratory during the academic year 1924–1925; a mademoiselle Larche who appears to have been attached to the laboratory during the academic year 1927–1928; and Irena Manteuffel from Riga who spent a few months in the laboratory from October 1933.

=== Other professions ===
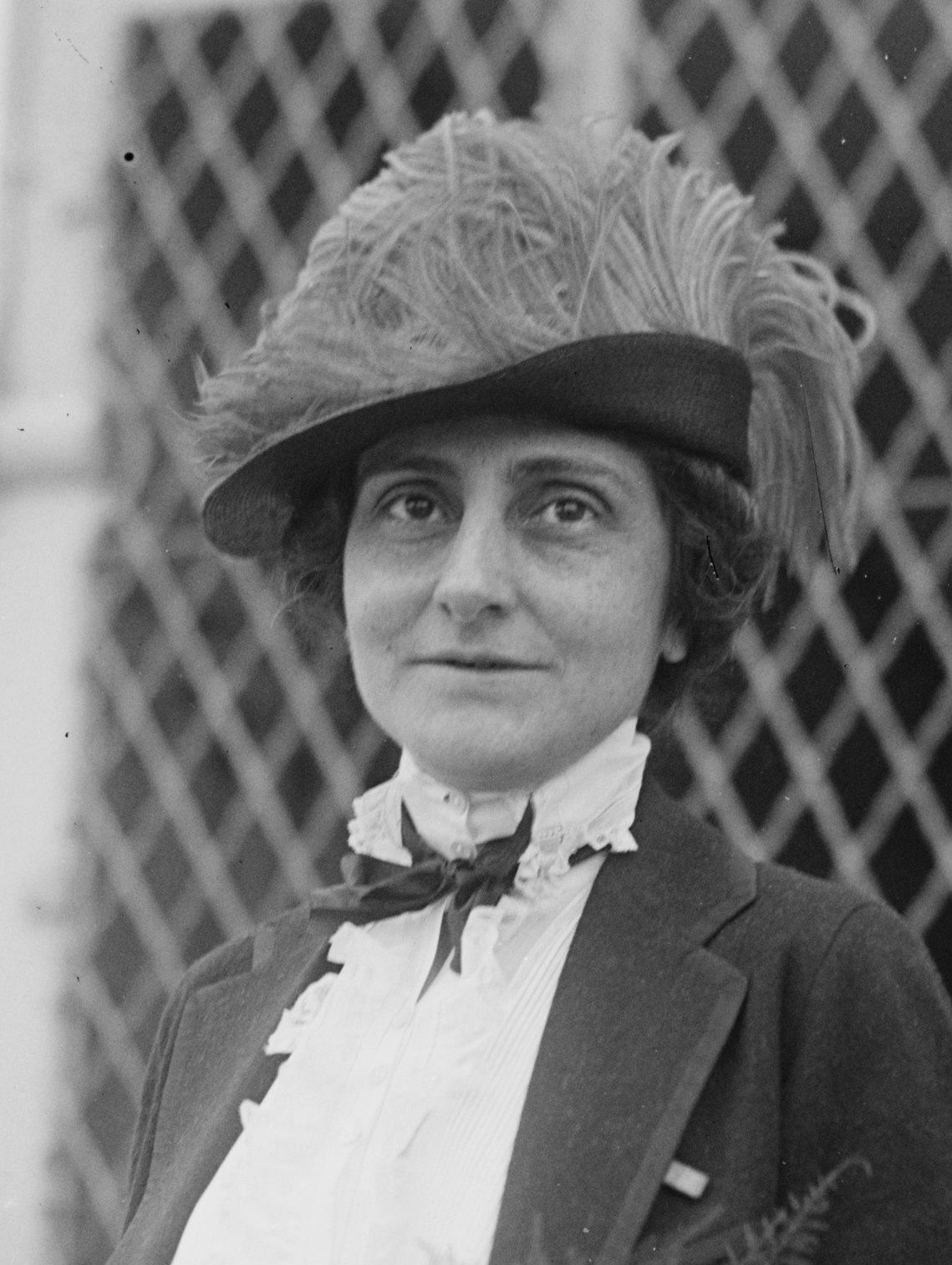
Marie Mattingly Meloney

- Charlotte Kellogg (née Hoffman, 1874 –1960), American activist who raised funds to help Marie Curie research and escorted her to the United States.
- Camille Marbo (1883–1969), also known as Marguerite Borel (née Appell), French writer that provided shelter to the Curies during the press revelations of the Langevin affair.
- Marie Mattingly Meloney (1878–1943), American journalist who raised funds to help Marie Curie research on radium.
- Henriette Perrin-Duportal (1869–1938), French writer. The Perrins were close friends of the Curies and Henriette was a school teacher of Irène at The Cooperative.
- Loie Fuller (1862–1928) American dancer who befriended many scientists in Paris including the Curies. She gave private shows to them. Her "radium dance" (French: danse du radium) was inspired by Curies' research.
- Léonie Razet (née Petri, 1884—1950), permanent secretary of Marie Curie at the Radium Institute in Paris
- Jadwiga Sikorska (1846–1927), Polish schoolteacher, founder of the school in Warsaw which Marie Curie attended.

== See also ==
- List of women scientists before the 20th century
- List of women scientists in the 20th century
