= Renée Galabert =

French scientist (1894–1956)

- Born: May 28, 1894; Chartres, France
- Died: August 29, 1956 (aged 62); Rothschild Hospital, Paris, France
- Cause of death: Leukemia
- Education: University of Lyon
- Scientific career
- Workplaces: Curie laboratory; Société française d'énergie et de radio-chimie

Renée Galaber (1894–1956) was a French scientist who is remembered for working in the measurements department in the laboratory of Marie Curie from 1919. Charged with certifying the level of radioactivity in industrial materials, in 1921 she became head of the department. She was the only member of Curie's team who was neither involved in research nor in academic studies. In 1932, when it was revealed she was working with a company manufacturing radioactive products, she was dismissed from the laboratory and took up employment in the private sector. As a result of working with radioactive materials, she developed leukemia from which she died in 1956.

== Early life ==
Born in Chartres on 28 May 1894, Renée Galabert studied at the University of Lyon where she graduated in science. She hoped to continue her studies there but had to return to Chartres to look after her mother. There she taught in a lycée for boys. Following a recommendation, she wrote to Marie Curie in July 1919 asking whether she could work in her laboratory. Rather surprisingly, in view of Galabert's lack of experience, Curie accepted and she began to work at the laboratory on 15 September.

== Career ==
Charged with measuring radioactivity and purifying radioactive sources of radium and thorium, in 1921 she was promoted as head of the rather large measuring department which measured the radioactivity of materials from industry or from other laboratories. Unlike Catherine Chamié and Sonia Cotelle with whom she collaborated, she was not involved in other activities such as teaching or research.

As can be seen from her correspondence with Marie Curie, Galabert's health suffered from the high number of measurements she made. In the year 1930 alone, she was largely responsible for the department's 691 measurements. Curie, who greatly appreciated her work, insisted she should take medical leave and not return until she was in perfect health. All went well until 1932 when it was discovered that Galabert was also collaborating with other companies, in particular the Société française d'énergie et de radio-chimie in Courbevoie. Despite Curie's reluctance to dismiss Galabert, after receiving a complaint from another firm that Galabert was issuing official certificates for their competitor, Curie finally lost confidence in her and Galabert left to join the Société française d'énergie et de radio-chimie where in fact she earned a higher salary. Catherine Chamié took over her role in Curie's laboratory.

Now working mainly with thorium which was even more dangerous than radium, Galabert continued to work until the spring of 1956, finally contracting cancer.

Renée Galabert died from leukemia on 29 August 1956 in the Rothschild Hospital, Paris, aged 62.

== See also ==
- List of women associated with Marie Curie and Irène Joliot-Curie
