= Baschwitz =

Baschwitz is a surname. Notable people with the surname include:

- Ana Baschwitz (1960–2022), Spanish journalist and author
- Anne Levy-Baschwitz (1913–1997), French physicist
- Kurt Baschwitz ( 1886–1968), German journalist

== See also ==
- Isaac Bashevis Singer (1903–1991), Jewish American author
- Boschwitz
- Blochwitz
