= Nicole Girard-Mangin =

French physician (1878–1919)

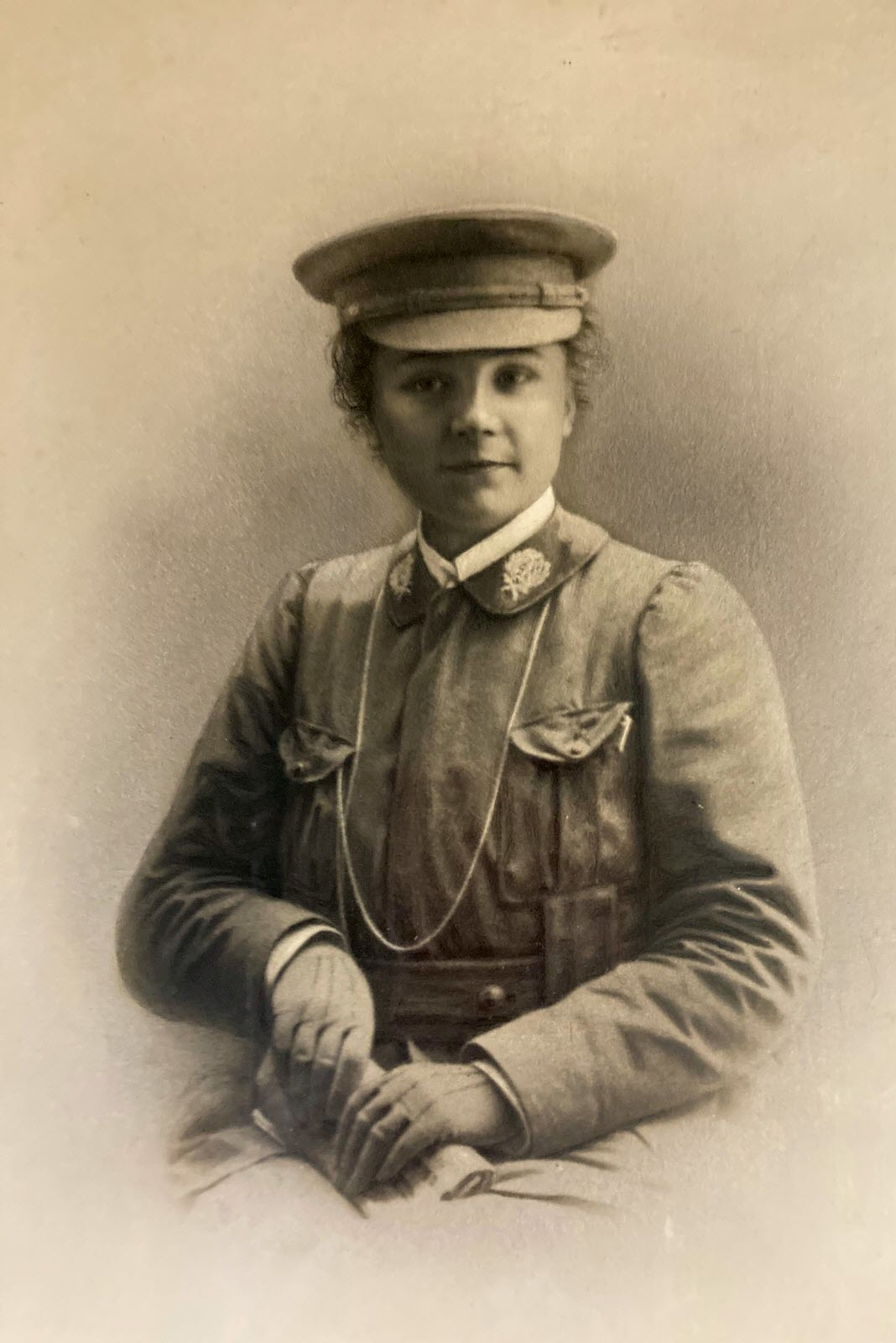
- Born: Nicole Mangin; 11 October 1878; Paris, France
- Died: 6 June 1919 (aged 40); Paris, France
- Occupation: Doctor
- Years active: 10 years
- Known for: First woman doctor in the French Army

Nicole Girard-Mangin (11 October 1878 – 6 June 1919) was the first female medical doctor to serve in the French Army. She served in several roles during the entire First World War. She was also a specialist in tuberculosis (TB). She collaborated with Marie Curie's Radium Institute to organise training of nurses in radiography.

== Early life ==
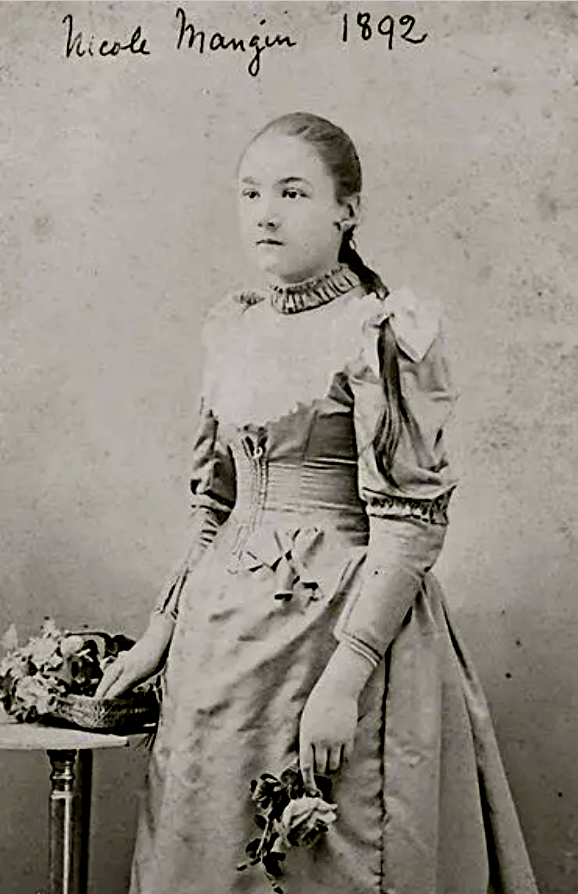
Mangin in 1892

Mangin was born in Paris on 11 October 1878. Both of her parents came from Varennes-en-Argonne, in the north-east region of France. Her father was a school teacher.

Mangin started her medical studies in 1896. In 1899, she married André Girard, adopting his surname alongside her own as Girard-Mangin. She interrupted her medical studies to help her husband on his family's vineyard in the Champagne region. After a son was born, the couple decided to get a divorce. Girard-Mangin resumed her studies and was able to submit her thesis in 1909. She specialised in tuberculosis and contagious disease, later opening a TB clinic and starting research on cancer.

== First World War ==
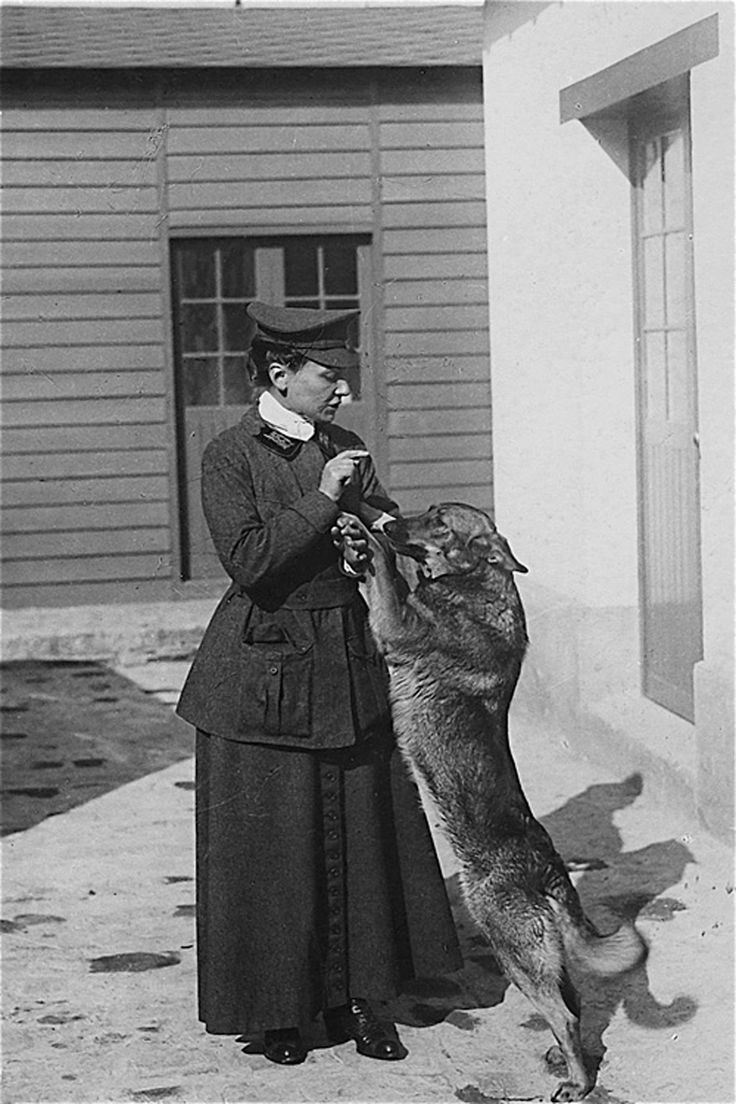
Girard-Mangin playing with her dog Dun

In early August 1914, the French military was mobilising across the country. France was rapidly calling up as many soldiers, nurses, and doctors it could in advance of the war that could start at any moment. Girard-Mangin, who was still using her ex-husband's surname, was called up. There might have been an error in her paperwork, which led to a clerk thinking that he was calling up Dr. Gerard Mangin. Nevertheless, her paperwork was in order and as a result, she became the first woman doctor in the French Army; however, she lacked an official rank or the pay of a doctor.

Her first posting saw her at a former health spa in Bourbonne-les-Bains, where her superior did not approve of having a woman as a doctor there. He wrote several times to headquarters requesting that Girard-Mangin be removed from this post. His requests were consistently refused as the French army still had a massive shortage of qualified doctors. Within a week of her posting, she saw her first patients, a trainload of wounded soldiers.

By November, she was posted to a military hospital at Verdun, where she stayed at until February 1916. She also received her first rank, as an Auxiliary Doctor, but her pay remained at nurses' level.

In Verdun, she treated patients with typhoid. However, starting in February 1916, the German launched an unexpected attack on the Verdun section. The Germans made major advances in a short amount of time. It became apparent that the hospital where Girard-Mangin was working might soon be captured by the enemy. She was able to escape, along with all of her patients. During the evacuation, Girard-Mangin was wounded when a shrapnel piece smashed the window of the vehicle that she was in.

Soon afterwards, she confronted her superior officer over her lack of rank and pay. After several months, she was promoted to Doctor Major, 2nd Class and awarded backpay. In 1917, she was promoted to the rank of doctor-captain and was appointed to be director of a training programme for nurses at the Edith Cavell Hospital in Paris. This operated in conjunction with a scheme at Marie Curie's Radium Institute to train women as radiographers to support the medical needs of the war fronts.

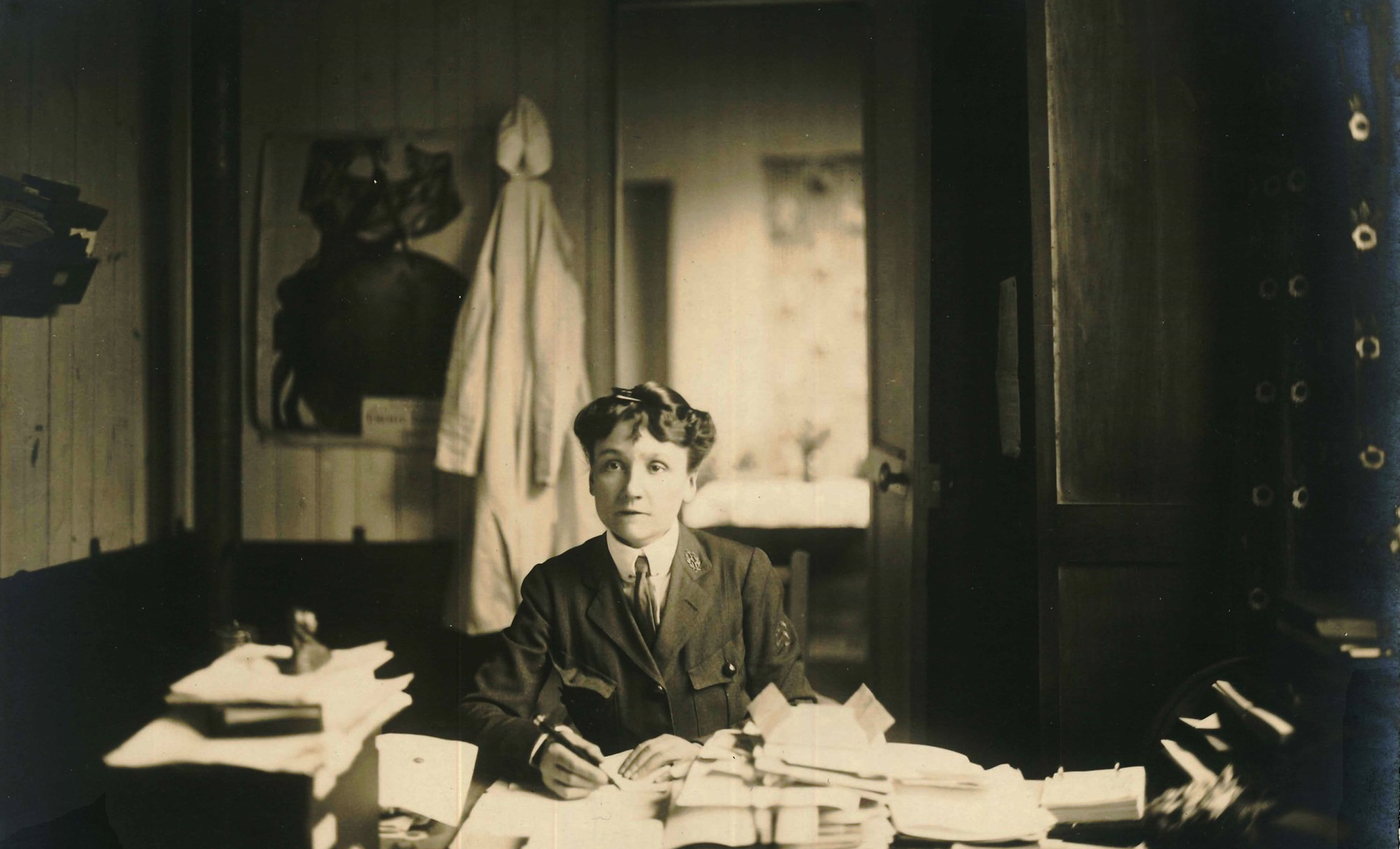
Nicole Girard-Mangin before 1919

While in Paris, she campaigned for the French Union for Women's Suffrage. She was a participant American Red Cross sessions about tuberculosis.

== Death ==
Girard-Mangin died on 6 June 1919, of a suspected overdose. Her biographer suggests that she was suffering from an incurable cancer and wished to shorten her suffering. An atheist, Girard-Mangin received a civilian funeral. She was cremated at Père Lachaise Cemetery, her ashes interred in the family tomb at Saint-Maur-des-Fossés.

== Commemoration ==
In 2026, Girard-Mangin was announced as one of 72 historical women in STEM whose names have been proposed to be added to the 72 men already celebrated on the Eiffel Tower. The plan was announced by the Mayor of Paris, Anne Hidalgo following the recommendations of a committee led by Isabelle Vauglin of Femmes et Sciences and Jean-François Martins, representing the operating company which runs the Eiffel Tower.

== See also ==
- List of women associated with Marie Curie and Irène Joliot-Curie
