= Anne Levy-Baschwitz =

French physicist (1913–1997)

- Born: Anne Baschwitz; 8 March 1913; Paris, France
- Died: 31 August 1997 (aged 84)
- Education: University of Paris
- Spouse: G. Levy
- Scientific career
- Fields: Physics
- Workplaces: Curie laboratory

Anne Levy-Baschwitz (née Baschwitz; 8 March 1913 – 31 August 1997) was a French physicist who worked in the laboratory of Marie Curie from October 1933 until September 1938.

== Biography ==
Anne Levy-Baschwitz was born Anne Baschwitz on 8 March 1913 in Paris, France. She graduated in physics at the University of Paris and joined the Curie laboratory in 1933 to prepare four diplômes d'études supérieures (DES) in mathematics, physics, chemistry and chemistry-physics. In the laboratory, she held the position of practical work assistant. While there, she also carried out research on the determination of the upper limit of the continuous beta spectrum of radium and on the bombardment of elements by slow neutrons.

In July 1938, she earned a DES in physics with a dissertation on the "Determination of the upper energy limit of the continuous beta spectrum of radioelements by the absorption method". Thereafter she married a gentleman called G. Levy and left the laboratory.

On 26 October 1967, in connection with Marie Curie's centenary celebrations in Paris, she attended a dinner with former colleagues from the laboratory.

She died on 31 August 1997, aged 84.

== See also ==
- List of women associated with Marie Curie and Irène Joliot-Curie
