= Madeleine Molinier =

French scientist and nurse (1898–1976)

- Born: Madeleine Monin; 1898
- Died: 1976 (aged 77–78)
- Occupations: Scientist; nurse
- Employer: Radium Institute
- Spouse: Henri Molinier (m. 1919)

Madeleine Molinier, née Monin (1898–1976) was a French scientist and nurse who from 1918 to 1921 worked with Marie Curie at the Radium Institute in Paris. When not teaching radiology to others in the laboratory, she undertook radioactivity measurements. In 1919, she married Henri Molinier, a chemical engineer whom she met in the laboratory. In the 1930s she studied nursing, receiving the diploma of hospital nurse in 1937. During and after the Second World War, she worked at the Suzanne Pérouse Hospital in Paris where she became technical director in 1947.

== See also ==
- List of women associated with Marie Curie and Irène Joliot-Curie
