= Alicja Dorabialska =

Polish chemist (1897–1975)

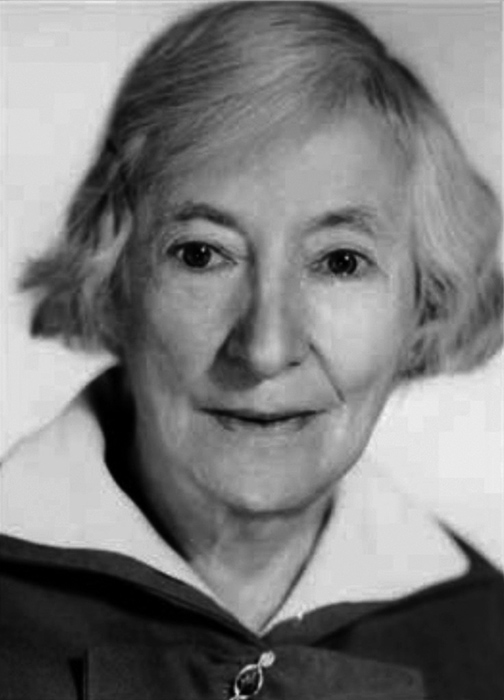
- Born: 14 October 1897; Sosnowiec, Vistula Land, Russian Empire (now Poland)
- Died: August 7, 1975; Warsaw
- Education: Moscow Higher Women's Courses; University of Warsaw (Ph.D.)
- Scientific career
- Fields: Chemistry
- Workplaces: Warsaw University of Technology; Lviv Polytechnic

Alicja Dorabialska (14 October 1897 – 7 August 1975), was a Polish chemist and professor at the Lviv Polytechnic, specialized in radiochemistry. She was a student and close companion of Marie Curie from 1925.

== Early life ==
Alicja Dorabialska was born in Sosnowiec, Vistula Land, Russian Empire (now Poland) on 14 October 1897. She was the daughter of Tomasz Dorabialski, who headed the local post office, and his wife Helena née Kamińska, a schoolteacher. After her parents had refused to send her to a Russian school, she graduated from a private high school in Warsaw in 1914 and then enrolled in the Physical-Mathematical Department of the Moscow Higher Women's Courses the following year, graduating in 1918 under the supervision of Wojciech Świętosławski. When Świętosławski moved to Warsaw, Dorabialska followed him and received her Ph.D. from the University of Warsaw in 1922. Marie Curie, whom she met in Warsaw in connection with the 25th anniversary of the discovery of polonium, invited her to study at the Radium Institute, Paris where she arrived for the academic year 1925–1926.

== Career ==
Dorabialska was an assistant in the Institute of Physical Chemistry in Warsaw University of Technology from 1918. While at Curie's Radium Institute, she conducted research on calculating the energy released by chemical reactions involving radioisotopes. In 1926, she returned to Poland to work on the energy derived from nuclear reactions.

Dorabialska received a position as assistant professor at the University of Technology in 1929. During the winter of 1929–1930, she spent a short period in Curie's laboratory where, together with Irène Joliot-Curie she carried out research on the heat emitted from polonium, using a new type of calorimeter specially brought in from Poland.

In 1930, she returned to Warsaw, once again joining Świętosławski. In 1934, she was appointed an assistant professor in the department of physical and inorganic chemistry of Lviv Polytechnic and served as the department chair during World War II. She therefore became to first women to receive a post at what is now known as the National Technical University of Ukraine. In 1945 Dorabialska was promoted to full professor and served as dean of the chemistry department from 1945 to 1951, experiencing Nazi antisemitism which she tried to combat. Following the Second World War, she was also chair of the department from 1945 to 1968. She later moved to Lodz where she taught at the newly established faculty of physics and chemistry until 1968 when she returned to Warsaw.

Alicja Dorabialska died on 7 August 1975 in Warsaw, aged 77.

== Activities ==
Dorabialska wrote her dissertation on thermochemical investigations on stereoisomerism in ketones under the supervision of Wojciech Świętosławski.

== See also ==
- List of women associated with Marie Curie and Irène Joliot-Curie
