= Marguerite Macaigne =

French physicist (1908–2000)

- Born: Marguerite Antoinette Camille Macaigne; March 13, 1908; Lille, France
- Died: November 3, 2000 (aged 92); Paris, France
- Education: University of Paris
- Scientific career
- Fields: Physics
- Workplaces: Curie laboratory

Marguerite Macaigne (1908–2000), French physicist who worked in Marie Curie's laboratory in Paris from October 1932 on a photographic method for studying the absorption of beta radiation into matter. Following Curie's death, she remained in the laboratory until the summer of 1935.

== Biography ==
Born in Lille on 13 March 1908, Marguerite Antoinette Camille Macaigne graduated from the physics department at the University of Paris. On the recommendation of Georges Fournier and Marcel Guillot, who wanted to involve her in their work on the absorption of beta radiation, she joined Curie's laboratory on 12 October 1932. In June 1933, she was one of the first to move to the Arcueil annex which had just opened. There she studied the extraction of Radium E using a microphotometric approach.

Following Curie's death in July 1934, Macaigne remained at the laboratory until she left in the summer of 1935. At the time, she apparently lived with her mother in the 16th arrondissement of Paris.

Marguerite Macaigne died on 3 November 2000 in Paris, aged 92.

== See also ==
- List of women associated with Marie Curie and Irène Joliot-Curie
