= May Sybil Leslie =

English chemist (1887–1937)

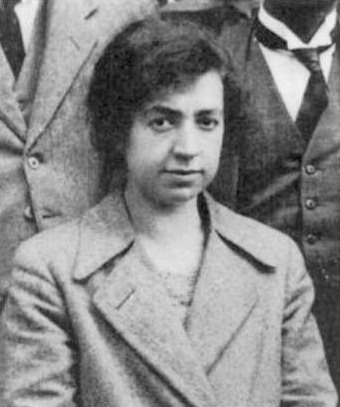
- Born: 14 August 1887; Woodlesford, Yorkshire, England
- Died: 3 July 1937 (aged 49); Bardsey, West Yorkshire, England
- Education: University of Leeds, England
- Spouse: Alfred Hamilton Burr
- Scientific career
- Workplaces: Royal Society of Chemistry; Curie Institute; Victoria University of Manchester; Bangor University; University of Leeds
- Academic advisors: Marie Curie; Ernest Rutherford

May Sybil Leslie, married name May Sybil Burr, (14 August 1887 – 3 July 1937) was an English chemist who was raised in Yorkshire, England, in a working class environment. After excelling at school and Leeds University, she went on to work with Marie Curie and Ernest Rutherford undertaking research on thorium and actium. During the First World War, she worked in an explosives factory near Liverpool where she was promoted to head the research laboratory after significantly improving the production of nitric acid needed for large-scale explosives manufacture. In 1920, she was elected a Fellow of the Chemical Society.

== Early life and education ==
May Sybil Leslie was born on 14 August 1887 to Elizabeth Dickinson and Frederick Leslie, a coal miner and bookseller. The youngest of the family's three children, she was educated in Woodlesford and Leeds in West Yorkshire, completing her secondary education in 1905. She received her BSc in chemistry with first-class honours from the University of Leeds in 1908. The following year, she was awarded an M.Sc. for research with Harry Medforth Dawson on the kinetics of the iodination of acetone. This research was then published in 1909 in the Transactions of the Chemistry Society.

== Career ==
Thanks to the grant she received in connection with her master's degree, in 1909 Leslie was able to become a research assistant in Marie Curie's Institute in Paris where she remained until 1911. In the laboratory, under the guidance of André Debierne, she worked mainly with Lucie Blanquiès, Eva Ramstedt and Ellen Gleditsch, with whom she shared accommodation in a nearby pension. She wrote several articles in French on extraction of new elements from thorium and their properties. She had many contributions on the "emanation of radioactive thorium", and her minute measurement practices allowed her to provide robust data on the half-life, atomic weight and activity of the products of the disintegration series of thorium ("the thorium series") and actinium ("the actinium series"). These contributions were the latest in the developing field of radioactivity. She collaborated with and became long term friends with Polish-Russian physicist Jadwiga Szmidt during their time at the Curie Institute.

Upon recommendation from Curie, she then moved to Manchester to work with Ernest Rutherford at the Physical Laboratory of the Victoria University (1911–1912). In particular, she undertook research on the properties of thorium and actinium, demonstrating that "products from different decay series were probably radon".

After leaving Manchester she worked as a high school teacher in West Hartlepool (1912–1913) and as an assistant lecturer and demonstrator in chemistry at the University College in Bangor, Wales (1914–1915).

During World War I Leslie was hired in 1915 by the government to work as a chemist on explosive production, concentrating on nitric acid, for WWI efforts. She was promoted to head the research lab at H.M. Explosives Factory in Litherland near Liverpool after optimising the production of nitric acid which was required for the large-scale manufacture of explosives. As women were held in low esteem in science and engineering at the time, she was the first woman to be recognised for her war work and to be given a significant promotion. Thus both her Bangor and Liverpool appointments were unusual and could be explained by the shortage of men during the war. Leslie lost her job in explosives research in 1917 as male engineers returned from the front.

In 1918 Leslie was awarded a doctoral degree by the University of Leeds for her combined work on thorium and explosives, which "contributed effectively towards the solution of urgent technical problems". As a result, she was the first woman to be awarded a doctorate by the University of Leeds. The same year she became a demonstrator in chemistry at Leeds and in 1928 a full lecturer in physical chemistry. During those years her research mostly focused on the chemistry of synthetic dyes.

She was elected a Fellow of the Chemical Society in 1920, the first year women were admitted as fellows.

In 1923 Leslie married Alfred Hamilton Burr, a chemist at the University of Salford. In 1929 she left Leeds to stay with her husband. Only after his death in 1933 did she return, continuing to work in Leeds until a month before she died.

May Sybil Leslie-Burr died in her home at Bardsey, West Yorkshire, of lung cancer on 3 July 1937, aged 49.

== Posthumous recognition and obituaries ==
Leslie's name is one of those featured on the sculpture Ribbons, unveiled in 2024.

The obituary in The Yorkshire Post depicted her as "one of the University's most distinguished women graduates". Writing in the Journal of the Chemical Society, Herbert Dawson commented, "She was exceptionally gifted and spared no effort to remove the difficulties encountered by students in their contract with scientific problems."

== See also ==
- List of women associated with Marie Curie and Irène Joliot-Curie

== Main publications ==
- Leslie, M. S. (1911). "Le thorium et ses produits de désagrégation". Le Radium. 8 (10): 356–363. doi:10.1051/radium:01911008010035601.
- Leslie, M. S. (1912). "Sur la période du radiothorium et le nombre des particules α données par le thorium et ses produits". Le Radium. 9 (8): 276–277. doi:10.1051/radium:0191200908027601.
- Leslie, M. S. (1912). "LXI.A comparison of the coefficients of diffusion of thorium and actinium emanations, with a note on their periods of transformation". Philosophical Magazine. Series 6. 24 (142): 637–647. doi:10.1080/14786441008637369.
- Mrs. May Sybil Leslie Burr (1925). The Alkaline Earth Metals. Griffin.
- John Newton Friend; Joshua Craven Gregory; May Sybil (Leslie) Burr (1926). Beryllium and its congeners. Griffin.
