= Angèle Pompéi =

Corsican professor and researcher (1898–1990)

- Born: Maire-Angèle Pompéi; 4 February 1898; Borgo, Corsica, France
- Died: 13 February 1999 (aged 101)
- Education: École normale supérieure de jeunes filles
- Scientific career
- Fields: Physics
- Workplaces: Curie laboratory

Angèle Pompéi (4 February 1898 – 13 February 1990) was a French scientist and friend of Irène Curie who contributed to the Curie laboratory from 1929 until at least 1949.

== Early life and education ==
Born in Borgo, Corsica, on 4 February 1898, Maire-Angèle Pompéi was the daughter of the schoolteacher Dom-Pierre Pompéi and his wife Constance (née Vallé), also a schoolteacher. She was the first of the family's seven children. After primary education under her parents, she was a boarder at a secondary school in Marseille where she passed the entrance examination for the École normale supérieure de jeunes filles in Sèvres (1919-1922) where she succeeded in earning the agrégation secondary-school teaching diploma in physics. It was on a geology trip in connection with her studies that she developed a friendship with Irène Curie which was to last throughout Curie's life. They first spent a holiday together in Pompéi's native Corsica in 1923.

== Career ==
Pompéi's first assignment was at the girls' lycée in Algiers, where she was accommodated in the home of the headmistress, Marie Elichabe, and her sister Madeleine, also a teacher. She remained there for a number of years, allowing her to invite Irène Curie and her mother Marie to visit her early in 1925. In 1928, Pompéi together with the Elichabe sisters returned to France, to teach physics and chemistry first in Saint-Germain-en-Laye, then in Fénelon.

In 1928, Pompéi asked Marie Curie if she could carry out research without remuneration in her laboratory. This was granted and in 1929, Marie Curie reported that she was investigating the influence of the source on the radiation of Radium E. Pompéi continued to undertake research in the laboratory at least until 1949. She retired as a teacher in 1964.

Angèle Pompéi died on 13 February 1909, aged 101.

== See also ==
- List of women associated with Marie Curie and Irène Joliot-Curie
