= Isabel Jocelyn Waldbauer =

Canadian scientist (1905–1968)

- Born: Isabelle Jocelyn Patton; November 30, 1895; Montreal, Canada
- Died: January 27, 1968 (aged 72)
- Education: McGill University; University of Iowa
- Spouse: Louis Waldbauer (m. 1927)
- Children: 3
- Scientific career
- Fields: Physics; medicine
- Workplaces: Curie laboratory

Isabel Jocelyn Waldbauer, née Patton (1905–1968) was a Canadian scientist who worked in Marie Curie's laboratory together with her husband from July 1927 for a short period. After they had a child in January 1928, they moved to Canada before proceeding to Iowa City where she earned a medical doctorate. In 1937, she was the first woman to become an intern at the Montreal Homeopathic Hospital. She is also remembered as an authority on the drug aureomycin.

== Early life and education ==
Born in 30 November 1895 in Montreal, Canada, Isabelle Jocelyn Patton, who used the name Jocelyn, was the daughter of the specialist Hugh Mathewson Patton, cofounder of the Montreal Homeopathic Hospital, and his wife Isabelle Jocelyn née Bradford. She was the eldest of the family's three children.

== Career ==
In the mid-1920s, Patton graduated from McGill University and thereafter received a grant from the Canada Research Council which enabled her to ask Marie Curie for a place in her laboratory. While at university, she had met Louis Waldbauer, with whom in April 1926 she published a paper on radioactivity titled "The radioactivity of the alkali metals". Waldbauer also received a research grant and the couple arrived in France in late autumn 1926. Following their marriage in mid-January, on 26 March 1927, Curie invited them both to join the laboratory, where they were charged with researching the effects of potassium and rubidium.

Their research required the use of an electroscope but the one in the laboratory proved to be too sensitive to drafts, humidity and temperature. They developed plans to acquire a replacement but in the meantime, Jocelyn had moved to England where she had a baby, Hugh Louis Frederick, on 4 January 1928. Rather than spend another year in the Curie laboratory, the couple then moved to Canada, arriving in Quebec in August 1928. They then proceeded to Iowa City, where their second child David was born in 1930. A third child, Isabelle, was born in 1932.

Jocelyn studied at the University of Iowa's college of medicine where she earned a medical doctorate in 1933. In 1957, Waldbauer became the first woman to work as an intern at Montreal Homeopathic Hospital which was founded by her father. She apparently remained in Montreal until her death on 27 January 1988, aged 72. Following her death, the Canadian newspaper Oshawa Times reported that she was considered to have been an authority on the drug aureomycin.

== See also ==
- List of women associated with Marie Curie and Irène Joliot-Curie
