= Alice Scouvart =

Belgian scientist (1885–1932)

- Born: Alice Julie Mélanie Jeanne Scouvart; 1885
- Died: 1932 (aged 46–47)
- Education: Université libre de Bruxelles
- Scientific career
- Fields: Physics; mathematics
- Workplaces: Curie laboratory

Alice Julie Mélanie Jeanne Scouvart (1885–1932) was a Belgian scientist who earned a doctorate in physics and mathematics with the highest distinction from the Université libre de Bruxelles in 1911. Thanks to the grant she received, she was able to study in Paris under Marie Curie. After visiting foreign laboratories, especially in California and Berkeley, she returned to Belgium where she headed the Lycée Émile Jacqmain (1922–1926). After suffering from poor health for several years, she died in 1932, aged 47.

== See also ==
- List of women associated with Marie Curie and Irène Joliot-Curie
