= Randi Holwech =

Norwegian scientist and painter (1890–1967)

- Born: Randi Holwech; 13 October 1890; Mandal, Norway
- Died: 13 January 1967 (aged 76); Italy
- Education: Norwegian Institute of Technology; Norwegian National Academy of Fine Arts
- Known for: Electrochemistry
- Scientific career
- Fields: Chemistry, Fine arts

Randi Holwech (13 October 1890 – 13 January 1967) Norwegian scientist and painter born in Frederikstad. In 1919 she joined Marie Curie to undertake research at the Radium Institute in Paris. She then returned to Norway to work for a few years as a laboratory chemist before turning to art. In 1961, one of her watercolours was exhibited at the National Gallery in Oslo. She died in Italy.

== Life ==
Born on 13 October 1890 in the Norwegian city of Frederkstad, Randi Holwech was the daughter of the engineer Olaf Holwech. In 1912, she was already in Paris where she studied History of Science at the École pratique des hautes études. By 1915, she had however taken a firm interest in science itself, studying electrochemistry at the Norwegian Institute of Technology (NHT), graduating in 1919. As a result, she was one of the first two women to graduate as engineers from the NHT. The other was Margot Dorenfeldt.

The Norwegian engineer, Ellen Gleditsch, with whom she was acquainted, wrote to Marie Curie in July 1919 asking whether she could return to the Radium Institute together with one of her particularly bright students. As a result, Holwech spent the academic year 1919–1920 working in Marie Curie's laboratory. She then returned to Norway where she worked for some years as a chemist.

Despite the scientific backgrounds of her father and her brother, she failed to make a name as a scientist and turned to art. From 1926, she studied at the Norwegian National Academy of Craft and Art Industry (1926–1928) and then at the Norwegian National Academy of Fine Arts (1927–1930) under Axel Revold. She exhibited from 1934 and in 1961 one of her watercolours was exhibited at the National Gallery] in Oslo.

During the Second World War, Holwech turned to the far right, heading a group under the Nazi occupiers.

Randi Holwech died in Italy on 13 January 1967, aged 77.

== See also ==
- List of women associated with Marie Curie and Irène Joliot-Curie
