= Boschwitz =

Boschwitz is a surname. Notable people with the surname include:

- Rudy Boschwitz (born 1930), American politician
- Ulrich Alexander Boschwitz (1915–1942), German author

== See also ==
- Baschwitz
- Blochwitz
