= Eric M. Furst =

American chemical engineer

- Education: Carnegie Mellon University; Stanford University; Curie Institute
- Occupation: Chemical engineer

Eric M. Furst is an American chemical engineer. He is the William H. Severns Jr. Distinguished Chair Professor in the department of chemical and biomolecular engineering at the University of Delaware.

In 2026, Furst was named a fellow of the American Physical Society, "for advancing the understanding of soft materials through pioneering research in microrheology, colloid physics, and directed self-assembly; and for contributing significantly to the physical sciences community through education and service".
