= Blochwitz =

Blochwitz is a surname. Notable people with the surname include:

- Hans Peter Blochwitz (born 1949), German lyric tenor
- Steffen Blochwitz (born 1967), East German cyclist
- Wolfgang Blochwitz (1941–2005), German footballer

== See also ==
- Blochwitz, a subdivision of Lampertswalde, Germany
- Boschwitz
- Baschwitz
