= Catherine Chamié =

French chemist (1888 – 1950)

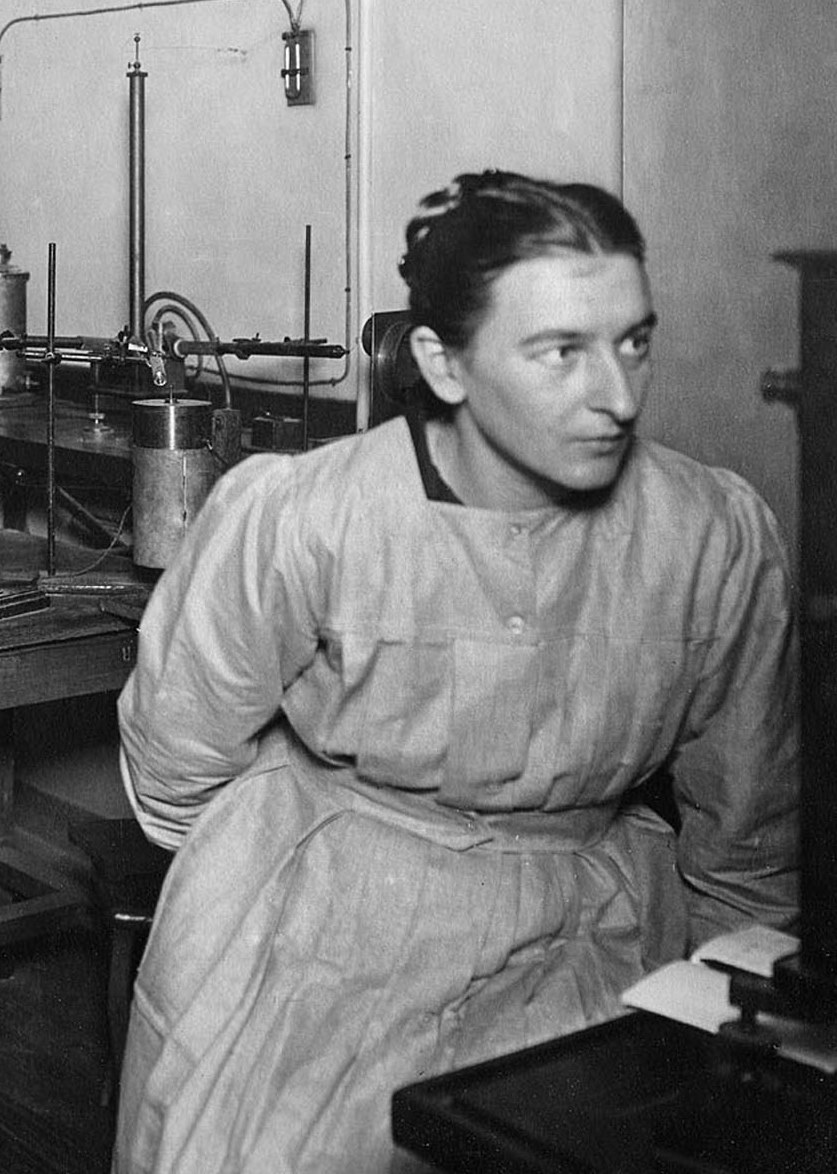
- Catherine Chamié in the Marie Curie laboratory of the Radium Institute around 1922
- Born: 13 December 1888
- Died: July 14, 1950 (aged 61)
- Occupations: Chemist, teacher
- Known for: First measured the half-life of radon in conjunction with Irène Joliot-Curie

Catherine Chamié (13 December 1888 – 14 July 1950) was a French chemist. In conjunction with Irène Joliot-Curie, she first measured the half-life of radon. She also undertook extensive research on the photographic effect of groupings of atoms, an effect which bears her name, known as Chamié effect.

== Early life and education ==
Born on 13 December 1888 in Odessa, Catherine Chamié was the daughter of the Franco-Syrian notary Antoine Chamié, and his Russian wife Helene Golovkine.

After completing her school education in Odessa in 1907, she enrolled at the Faculty of Sciences of the University of Geneva in the same year. She received a doctorate degree in electrical physics in 1913. Her thesis ‘The Influence of the Rate of Variation of the Magnetising Field on Alternating Hysteresis’ was written under the supervision of Charles-Eugène Guye.

Chamie later returned to Russia and continued her study on voltages in gas discharge tubes at the physics laboratory of the University of Petrograd.

During the First World War, she worked as a war nurse in the clinics set up at the University of Odessa until 1916. After the war, she continued her scientific work as a mathematics assistant at the University of Odessa.

During the Russian Revolution, on 4 April 1919, her family fled Odessa with the French troops and reached a refugee settlement at Voreppe, near Grenoble. After staying for a period of five months at Voreppe, she moved to Paris looking for educational and employment opportunities to support her family. During the 1919–20 academic year, she enrolled a number of free courses related to radioactivity offered by the Collège de France, Paris. Simultaneously she worked as a science teacher and offered private lessons in an educational institution. During this time, one of Chamié's Russian/Ukrainian refugee students was Bianca Tchoubar, who later credited her with inspiring her to study chemistry, referring to Chamié as her "mother in chemistry".

== Career ==
After completing the courses and gained experiences in the field of radioactivity, she wrote to Marie Curie for seeking opportunities to work on a part-time basis at her laboratory in the Radium Institute. Marie offered her a position. Chamié later joined as a chemist on a voluntary basis at the department of measurement of the Radium Institute. Her works included the preparation of radium salts and the analysis of radioactive ores from the Congo. She soon got a research grant, the Jacques Vignon bursary from the Sorbonne, which made her work at the Radium Institute as a paid job. Between 1920 and 1934, she assisted Marie Curie in her major research works. Chamié kept up a correspondence with Norwegian radio chemist Ellen Gleditsch who had worked at Curie's laboratory earlier in her career.

In 1934, following the departure of Renée Galabert, she became the head of the department of measurement and carried out research in the field of medical applications of radioactivity. In 1929 she became a naturalised French citizen.

She died at the age of 61 in Paris on 14 July 1950 of “radiation-related causes”.

== Chamié effect ==
The Chamié effect is a method developed by Chamié which involves exposing photographic film to the reactive solution to determine whether the small quantity of radioactive compound used was soluble or insoluble in the solvent. This method was later called as Chamié effect by Otto Hahn and Irène Joliot-Curie.

== Publications ==
Between 1921 and 1950, she wrote more than 40 research articles. Her important works include

- New principles of psychology, their application to the study of systems of knowledge and personality (1937)
- Psychology of knowledge: Formation, structure and evolution of scientific knowledge (1950)

== See also ==
- List of women associated with Marie Curie and Irène Joliot-Curie
