= Paul Bonét-Maury =

French judoka (1900–1972)

Paul Albert Antoine Bonét-Maury (French: [pɔl bɔne mɔʁi]; 7 February 1900–17 April 1972) was an early French judoka, president of the Fédération française de judo, and a French radiobiologist.

== Biography ==
Paul Bonét-Maury was born in 1900 in the 6th arrondissement in Paris. He had twin careers, in both the sporting and medical fields. He died in Paris, in the 13th arrondissement, in 1972.

== Scientific career ==
Paul Bonet-Maury studied at the faculties of medicine, pharmacy and sciences of Paris.

He obtained a doctorate in pharmacy in 1925. In October of the same year, he entered the Laboratoire Curie. Here he worked on the action of X-rays and radioactivity on living cells with Fernand Holweck and Antoine Lacassagne.

He was successively Master of Research (1930–1965), then Honorary Research Master (1966), having been Professor at the National Institute of Nuclear Science and Technology at the CNRS (National Center for Scientific Research) since 1960.

He was head of the Biophysics Laboratory of the Institute Alfred Fournier from 1941 to 1950. In 1950, he was appointed by Irène Joliot-Curie to create the Radium Institute's Radiation Protection Service. He was director of this department until 1962. Paul Bonet-Maury was an active trade unionist within l'Association des travailleurs scientifiques, (ATS) (the Association of Scientific Workers), of which he became secretary in 1946. From 1965 to 1966, he was president of la Société française de radioprotection.

He invented the absolute photocolorimeter and the recording biophotometer.

== Sporting career ==
Paul Bonét-Maury practiced many sports such as football, rugby, boxing, skiing, swimming, sailing, and tennis, but it was in judo (and Ju-jitsu and wrestling) that his name is particularly remembered.

In 1936, Paul Bonét-Maury met Jigoro Kano, the founder of judo, during the latter's trip to France. The same year saw the creation of the Jiu-jitsu Club of France. Paul Bonet-Maury became one of the two vice-presidents (the other being Moshe Feldenkrais, the founder of the club).

In 1942, judo formed a specialized section of the French Wrestling Federation and Paul Bonet-Maury was elected president.

In July 1944, Paul Bonét-Maury was appointed president of the French Wrestling Federation.

In 1946, he founded the French Federation of Judo and Jiu-Jitsu (FFJJJ), which broke away from the French Wrestling Federation and later became the French Federation of Judo-Jujitsu, Kendo and Associated Disciplines.

In 1947, he became a member of the brand new College of Black Belts, whose first elected president was Jean Andrivet.

He was president of the FFJJJ until 1956. He was then secretary-general of the International Judo Federation, from which he resigned in 1971 for health reasons.

Paul Bonet-Maury was the second Frenchman to win his black belt in judo. He reached 5th dan during his lifetime and was posthumously honored with 6th on September 14, 1975.

He was interred at the cimetière du Père-Lachaise (44th division).

== Publications ==
=== Scientific ===
- The Volatilization of Polonium, 1928.
- Radon action on the vaccine virus: Evaluating the diameter of corpuscles, 1941.
- Action of radon on yeast Saccharomyces ellipsoideus, 1942.
- "Ultraviruses viewed through the electron microscope", in La Presse médicale, No. 17, February 24, 1942 (with Constantin Levaditi).
- Evaluation of ultravirus size by irradiation, 1942.
- Evaluation of the size of the polio virus (Lansing strain) by irradiation, 1942 (with Constantin Levaditi).
- Measurement of Vaccine Virus Dimensions by Electron Micrography, 1942.
- Radiological investigations on the size and structure of the herpetic virus, 1942.
- Statistical methods for ultravirus titration, 1942.
- Determination, by the irradiation method, of the dimensions of the foot-and-mouth disease virus, neurotropic strain, 1943.
- "Immunizing power of Bacterium coli irradiated by the total radiation of radon", in Bull. Acad. med., vol. 127, p. 420 (with Constantin Levaditi).
- "Demonstration, by respisometry, of the bacteriostatic action of ionizing radiations", in Annales of the Pasteur Institute, vol. 69, 1943, p. 189.
- "Radiobiology: Conference at the Palace of Discovery on November 29, 1947", in The Conferences of the Palace of Discovery (ISSN 1762-4320), University of Paris and Palace of Discovery, Alençon, Poulet-Malassis, 1949.
- Irradiation of viruses, Paris, Maloine, 1948.
- "The Origin of Protein Phosphorus in Milk, Investigated by Radiophosphorus", in proceedings of the Academy of Sciences, vol. 230, No. 5, 1950, pp. 478–480 (with Henri Simonnet and Joseph Sternberg).
- "La radioprotection" - Paris Presses universitaires de France 1969.
- The Atomic Era: Encyclopedia of Modern Science.

=== Sporting ===
- "Judo et jiu-jitsu". Préface de M. Kawaiski,... 1946.
- "Le Judo", PUF, coll. « Que sais-je ? », 1971; 2e éd., 1975 (with Henri Courtine and Madeleine Ithurriague).

== Sources ==
"In memoriam : Paul Bonét-Maury", in la Revue olympique, no 55, April 1972, p. 186.
