= Ernst Føyn =

Norwegian chemist and oceanographer

- Born: 28 March 1904; Kristiania, Norway
- Died: 2 November 1984 (aged 80)
- Occupations: Chemist and oceanographer
- Employer: University of Oslo

Johan Ernst Fredrik Føyn (28 March 1904 – 2 November 1984) was a Norwegian chemist and oceanographer. He was born in Kristiania. He was assigned professor of oceanography at the University of Oslo from 1964. His research centred on radioactivity of ocean waters, and on pollution of the oceans. He designed a method for electrolytic cleaning of sewage. In 1969, he collaborated with Sonja Hanneborg at the Norwegian Institute of Marine Research.
