= Germaine Marie Wiswald =

Swiss engineer (1891–1988)

- Born: 1891; Switzerland
- Died: 8 August 1988 (aged 96–97); Geneva, Switzerland
- Other name: Germaine Pilorget
- Education: University of Geneva
- Spouse: Gaston Alphonse Pilorget (m. 1918; died 1948)
- Scientific career
- Fields: Chemical engineering
- Workplaces: Armet de Lisle; Radium Institute, Geneva

Germaine Marie Wiswald, frequently known by her married name Germaine Pilorget, (1891 – 8 August 1988), Swiss engineer who graduated in 1921 and went on to work with Marie Curie in Paris. She later worked at the Radium Institute in Geneva until its closure in 1962.

== Life ==
Born in 1891 in Switzerland, Germaine Marie Wiswald graduated as a chemical engineer from the University of Geneva in 1921. In 1918, she married Gaston Alphonse Pilorget and became known as Germaine Pilorget. After moving to Paris with her family, she contacted Marie Curie in 1924, seeking employment. In 1925, in connection with materials for the Curie laboratory, she was entrusted with chemical processing in the laboratory at the Armet de Lisle factory but had to leave in 1930 for reasons of poor health.

Following her husband's death in 1948, she worked for the Radium Institute in Geneva preparing radium ampoules for use in curietherapy until its closure in 1962, causing her to retire.

Germaine Pilorget died on 8 August 1988 in Geneva, age 97.

== See also ==
- List of women associated with Marie Curie and Irène Joliot-Curie
