= Suzanne Veil =

French chemist (1886–1956)

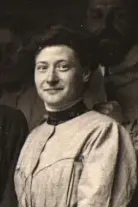
- in 1911
- Born: Suzanne Zélie Pauline Veil; 28 April 1886; Paris
- Died: February 24, 1956 (aged 69); Paris
- Occupations: Chemical engineer, translator
- Awards: Cahours Prize, Berthelot Medal

Suzanne Zélie Pauline Veil (28 April 1886 – 24 February 1956) was a French chemical engineer and translator. She is known for her research and her work during World War I training nurses in radiology methods to locate shrapnel in the bodies of wounded soldiers. In 2026, Veil was announced by the Mayor of Paris as one of 72 women in STEM whose careers were to be recognised through addition of their names to Eiffel Tower.

== Early life and education ==
Suzanne Zélie Pauline Veil was born in Paris on 28 April 1886.

From 1912 to 1918, Veil studied at the Radium Institute in Paris under French-Polish physicist and chemist Marie Curie, in preparation for doctoral enrolment. Her studies was interrupted by the outbreak of WWI. Initially, Veil contributed to the war effort through military telegraphy under General Gustave-Auguste Ferrié but, by 1916, she was working alongside Marie Curie to train nurses in radiology methods, ensuring effective radiology services near the front line. This enabled the nurses to locate shrapnel in the bodies of wounded soldiers.

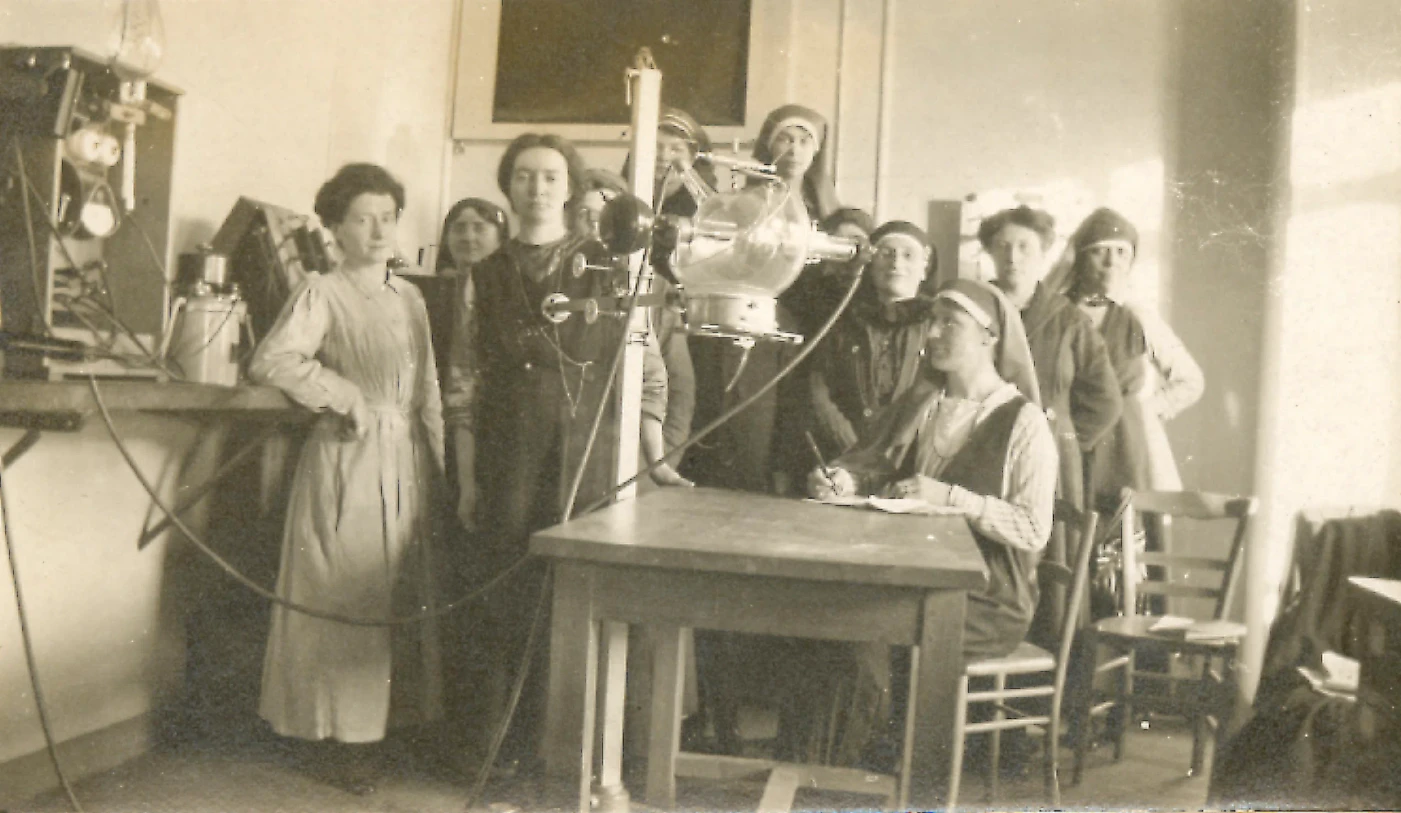
Suzanne Veil (left) then Irène Curie among the 7th group of radiology nurses trained at the Radium Institute in November 1917

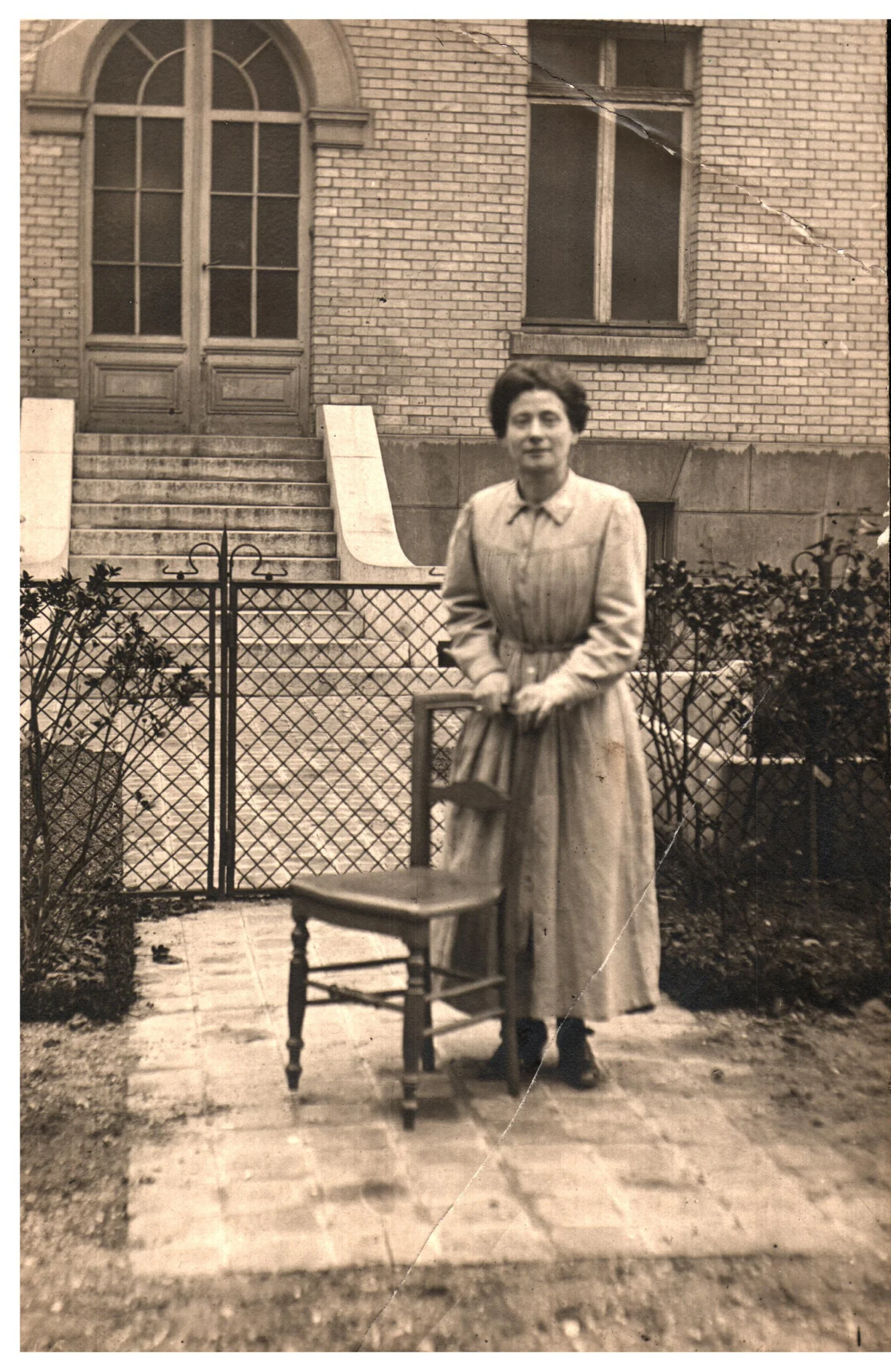
Suzanne Veil in the garden of the Radium Institute in the 1920s

After completing her studies at Marie Curie's Radium Institute, Veil went on to undertake her doctorate with chemist Georges Urbain at the Sorbonne's École Supérieure de Chimie, successfully defending her thesis on the properties of metallic oxides in 1920.

== Career ==
A year later, in 1921, she was head of the laboratory at the Faculté des sciences de Paris, where she collaborated with Francis W. Aston, a British chemist and physicist. She translated his seminal work on isotopes in 1923.

In 1930, Veil became head of research at the École Pratique des Hautes Études (EPHE), where she had served as an assistant from 1926. At EPHE, Veil remained under the direction of her long-time mentor, Georges Urbain. Simultaneously, she undertook research at the National Science Fund (French: Caisse Nationale des Sciences), an institution that preceded the French National Center for Scientific Research. During this time, Veil continued to specialise in inorganic chemistry; she studied metal oxides and their mixtures, including nickel, chromium and cobalt. Later on in the 1930s, she went on to publish her work in periodic chemical phenomena.

Veil was dismissed from her position in December 1940, during World War II. The Musée Curie suggests that this occurred because of laws restricting women's employment or because of anti-Jewish laws enacted by the Vichy government after the Nazi occupation of France began in June 1940. In 1945, Veil was reinstated to her position and continued in the post until its abolition in 1949. By the age of 63, she was still researching, continuing her work with the National Science Fund.

== Awards and honours ==
During her career, Veil's work was recognised, including through two awards in 1924: the Cahours Prize for and the French Academy of Sciences' Berthelot Medal.

More than a century later, in 2026, Veil was announced as one of 72 historical women in STEM whose names have been proposed to be added to the 72 men already celebrated on the Eiffel Tower. The plan was announced by the mayor of Paris, Anne Hidalgo following the recommendations of a committee led by Isabelle Vauglin of Femmes et Sciences and Jean-François Martins, representing the operating company which runs the Eiffel Tower.

== Selected publications ==
Veil published at least 49 times, including:

- Recherches sur quelques propriétés physico-chimiques des oxydes métalliques et de leurs mélanges, (Research on certain physico-chemical properties of metal oxides and their mixtures) (1920)
- Francis William Aston's Isotopes (1922) (translated as Les Isotopes by Suzanne Z. Veil, preface by Georges Urbain), Paris, J. Hermann, (1923) (BNF 31736929)
- Mme R. Duval, Mlle S. Veil et MM. C. Eichner, P. Job, V. Lombard, Nickel, chrome, cobalt, étude générale des complexes, (Nickel, chrome, cobalt, general study of complexes) (1933)
- Les Phénomènes périodiques de la chimie, (Periodic phenomena in chemistry) (1934)
- Manuel de radiologie industrielle (Handbook of industrial radiology) (1948)

== Personal life ==
Suzanne Veil died in Paris on 24 February 1956, aged 70.

== See also ==
- List of women associated with Marie Curie and Irène Joliot-Curie
