= Lucie Blanquiès =

French scientist (1879-1961)

- Born: Lucie Blanquiès; 25 June 1879; France
- Died: 14 September 1961 (aged 82)
- Education: École normale supérieure de jeunes filles
- Known for: Alpha particles emitted by radioactive materials
- Scientific career
- Fields: Radioactivity

Lucie Blanquiès (25 June 1879 - 14 September 1961) was a French scientist who worked in Marie Curie's laboratory in Paris from 1908 to 1910.

== Early life and education ==
Lucie Blanquiès was the youngest child in a large family, but only she and her brother Bernard survived infancy. Her father worked with metals.

When she was 20, she attended the École normale supérieure de jeunes filles in Sèvres, in the suburbs of Paris from 1899, studying in the science department. At the time, Marie Curie headed the department.

== Career ==
During her time at the Radium Institute (1908–1910), Blanquiès measured the power of the alpha particles emitted by different radioactive materials and also worked on actinium.

She then became a teacher first at a girls school in Saint-Germain-en-Laye. When she left, her role was taken over by Marthe Klein, who had also worked at the Radium Institute. Blanquiès moved on to teach at the Lycée Racine in Versailles where she taught until at least 1922. Thereafter, nothing is known of her later career, but in June 1940, she was able to draw on a retirement pension following over 42 years of teaching.

Lucie Blanquiès died on 14 September 1961.

== See also ==
- List of women associated with Marie Curie and Irène Joliot-Curie
