= Marthe Renard =

French pharmacist (b. 1903)

- Born: Marthe Leblanc; December 22, 1904; Lisieux, France
- Died: after 1967
- Education: University of Paris
- Scientific career
- Fields: Pharmacy
- Workplaces: Curie laboratory

Marthe Renard, née Leblanc (born 1903), French pharmacist who worked in Marie Curie's laboratory from around 1929 to 1932, in particular on the separation of plutonium.

== Biography ==
Marthe Leblanc was born on 22 December 1904 at Lisieux, where her father was a military adjutant. When she was 20, after receiving a diploma in pharmacy from the University of Paris, she passed the competition for hospital nurses and worked in two Paris hospitals before gaining employment in the Maternité Port-Royal. She went on to win two first prizes, that of the Fondation Prix Buignet for pharmacy (1925) and that of the Paris University's Pharmacy Faculty (1927). By 1928, she had graduated in science which allowed her to spend the academic year 1928-1929 working in Marie Curie's laboratory.

In 1929, Leblanc became the first woman to win the gold medal for pharmacy from the Hospitals of Paris which also included an award of 10,000 francs. At the time, she headed a pharmacy in central Paris which also had a bacteriological laboratory. Leblanc remained in Curie's laboratory until around 1935, preparing a doctorate. Curie noted in her 1930 report for the University of Paris that Leblanc was undertaking tests on the separation of plutonium in radiolead solutions.

Some time later, Marthe Leblanc married a gentleman by the name of Renard. As a result, at the dinner held in Paris on 26 October 1967 in connection with Marie Curie's centenary celebrations, she appeared as Madame Renard-Leblanc together with former colleagues at the laboratory.

The date of Marthe Renard's death is not known but it was after the 1967 dinner.

== See also ==
- List of women associated with Marie Curie and Irène Joliot-Curie
