= Sonia Cotelle =

Polish physicist and chemist (1896-1945)

- Sonia Cotelle measuring radioactivity in March 1922 in the Curie Laboratory
- Born: 19 June 1896; Warsaw, Vistula Land, Russian Empire
- Died: 18 January 1945 (aged 48); Paris
- Cause of death: Radiation poisoning
- Education: University of Paris (B.A.)
- Scientific career
- Fields: Radiochemistry
- Workplaces: University of Paris

Sonia Cotelle, (née Slobodkine) (19 June 1896 – 18 January 1945), was a Polish radiochemist who worked with Marie Curie at the Institut du Radium in Paris. While there, she collaborated on research into actium and helped determine the half-life of ionium, then known as thorium. Her work in radiochemistry caused her premature death which resulted from the effects of radiation poisoning.

== Early life ==
Sonia Slobodkine was born in Warsaw, capital of the Vistula Land, in the Russian Empire on 19 June 1896. She graduated from the University of Paris in 1922, where she majored in chemistry. She was professionally known by her married surname Cotelle.

== Career ==
While still a student, she began working in 1919 as an assistant in the Institut du Radium founded by the Nobel Laureates, Marie Curie and her husband Pierre, in the university's Faculty of Science (French: Faculté des sciences). Cotelle was in charge of the measurement service between 1924 and 1926, with a specialisation in preparing radioactive source. The department was the leading French institution in the field of radioactivity. She was then promoted to the role of chemist in the Faculté des sciences, in the “special framework” developed for the Curie laboratory.

With Dragoljub Yovanovitch, she is top centre, Jeanne Ferrier at top right

Cotelle was sent to the Institute of Radium in Prague, the capital of Czechoslovakia (now the Czech Republic), to set up radium standards there and conduct research at Jáchymov, where uranium ore was mined. Cotelle's signature is on the packaging of a Radiumchema pad produced by the Czech Kolin-Jachymov chemical company c. 1930, marketed as "The only radioactive products authorized by the State Establishments in St. Joachimsthal" with the claim that it contained 0.1 milligrams of radium.

She became seriously ill in 1927, probably radiation poisoning after accidentally ingesting a polonium solution while pipetting it. Irène Curie wrote to her mother Marie that Cotelle was "in very bad health... she has stomach troubles, extremely rapid loss of hair etc" and speculated that Cotelle may have swallowed some of the polonium she was working with, as Irène was doing similar work but not (yet) showing any signs of ill health. She recovered, but the incident ruined her health.

Cotelle "collaborated with Curie on studies of actinium. With Curie, she redetermined the half-life of thorium-230 (then known as ionium) using a method that minimised effects of error in atomic weights. Cotelle used electrolysis to prepare thin samples of radioactive substances for testing. This method allowed determination of polonium’s atomic number by X-ray spectroscopy".

In May 1934, when Marie Curie left her laboratory for the last time, going home feeling unwell, she asked Cotelle to clear away the actinium that she had been working on until she was able to return to work.

== Personal life ==
Slobodkine married Gustave Charles Cotelle, a lawyer, on 24 October 1922, taking his surname. They divorced nine years later in December 1931 but she retained the surname Cotelle.

Sonia Cotelle died on 18 January 1945 from the cumulative effects of radiation poisoning.

== See also ==
- List of women associated with Marie Curie and Irène Joliot-Curie
