= Antonia Elisabeth Korvezee =

Dutch chemist (1899-1978)

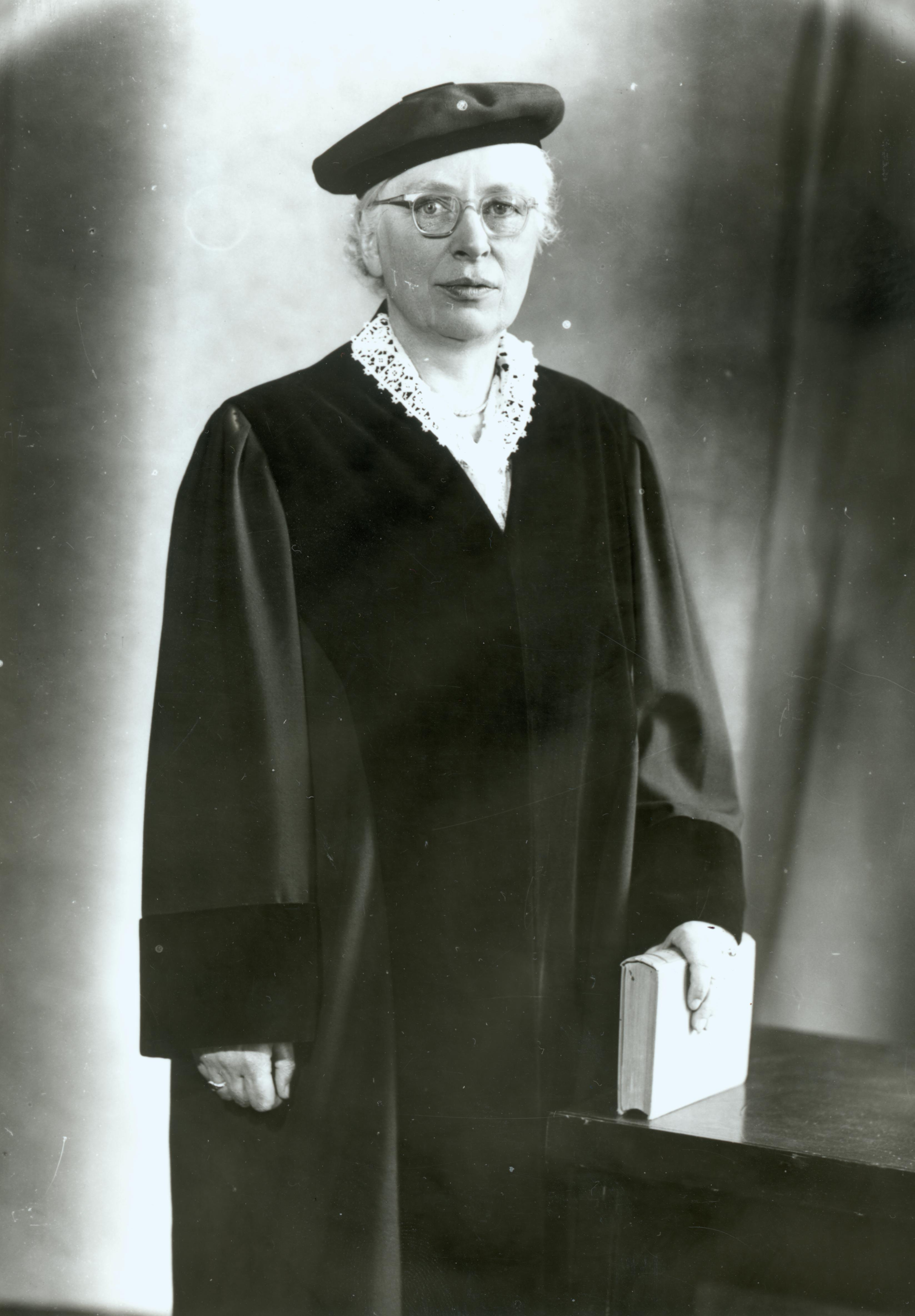
- Korvezee in 1954
- Born: March 8, 1899; Wijnaldum, Netherland
- Died: January 17, 1978 (aged 78); Hague
- Education: Delft Institute of Technology
- Scientific career
- Fields: Analytical chemistry
- Workplaces: Delft Institute of Technology

Antonia Elisabeth Korvezee (born 8 March 1899, in Wijnaldum, Netherlands – died 17 January 1978, in The Hague) was a Dutch theoretical chemist specializing in radioactivity. In 1954, she became the first woman appointed as a professor at the Delft University of Technology.

== Family and work ==
Korvezee was the youngest of two daughters of the pastor Willem Korvezee (1858–1913) and his wife Baukje Andringa (1874–1952). Her older sister, Elisabeth “Bets” Korvezee, later became the first female national archivist in the Netherlands. After their father's death in 1913, the family lived in The Hague, where both sisters attended the third municipal HBS, known as the “HBS-voor-jongens” (boys’ HBS), and Antonia showed particular talent for mathematics.

She went on to study chemical technology at the Delft Institute of Technology, graduating cum laude in 1922. She then worked as an assistant, first in the department of analytical chemistry and from 1924 to 1938 in the laboratory of Scheffer. Under Frans Everhardus Cornelis Scheffer, she completed her doctorate cum laude in 1930 with a thesis titled “Copper chlorides as a catalyst for the Deacon process.”

Between 1930 and 1932, she spent two six-month periods in Paris conducting research on radioactivity in Marie Curie’s laboratory. In 1935, her temporary appointment at Delft was made permanent, and she was appointed lecturer in radioactive decay.

Korvezee was passed over for a professorship three times, first nominated in 1936 for the chair of analytical chemistry, and again in 1940 for the chair of physical chemistry despite ranking third in the nomination process.

== Post-war and professorship ==
After the Netherlands in World War II in 1945, Korvezee returned to Delft, initially serving as a curator and, from 1948, as a lecturer in theoretical chemistry. Although an expert in radioactivity, she had no role in the planning of the reactor center later built on the university's grounds. When the chair became vacant following Scheffer's retirement, Korvezee was passed over once more.

In 1954, the Department of Chemical Technology created an extraordinary professorship for her in the emerging field of theoretical chemistry largely regarded as compensation for the chairs she had earlier missed. Her appointment on 14 April 1954, making her the first female professor at Delft, received extensive press coverage. As a full professor, however, she retained the salary of her former lectureship.

As professor, Korvezee supervised doctoral and master's students and published more than forty scientific works before 1940, many co-authored with fellow female assistants. She was a member of the Association of Women with an Academic Education (VVAO), though she was never actively involved in the women's movement despite being widely regarded as a feminist figure.

== Retirement and death ==
Korvezee officially retired in 1961. She died in The Hague on 17 January 1978 at the age of 78 possibly, according to some accounts, as a result of radiation sickness contracted during her research.

== See also ==
- List of women associated with Marie Curie and Irène Joliot-Curie
