= Diplôme d'études supérieures spécialisées =

Former French diploma

Diplôme d'études supérieures spécialisées (French pronunciation: [diplom detyd sypeʁjœʁ spesjalize], DESS) was an old diploma in France, which is no longer awarded. It completed a fifth year of higher education aimed at professional practice. It could be chosen after one had got a maîtrise universitaire. This diploma has been abolished when the bachelor/master/doctorate system had been introduced in Europe in the 2010s and was replaced by the masters.

In France, it is the current equivalent of a professional track within the national master's degree, called master professionnel until 2014.
