= Radiochemistry =

Chemistry of radioactive materials

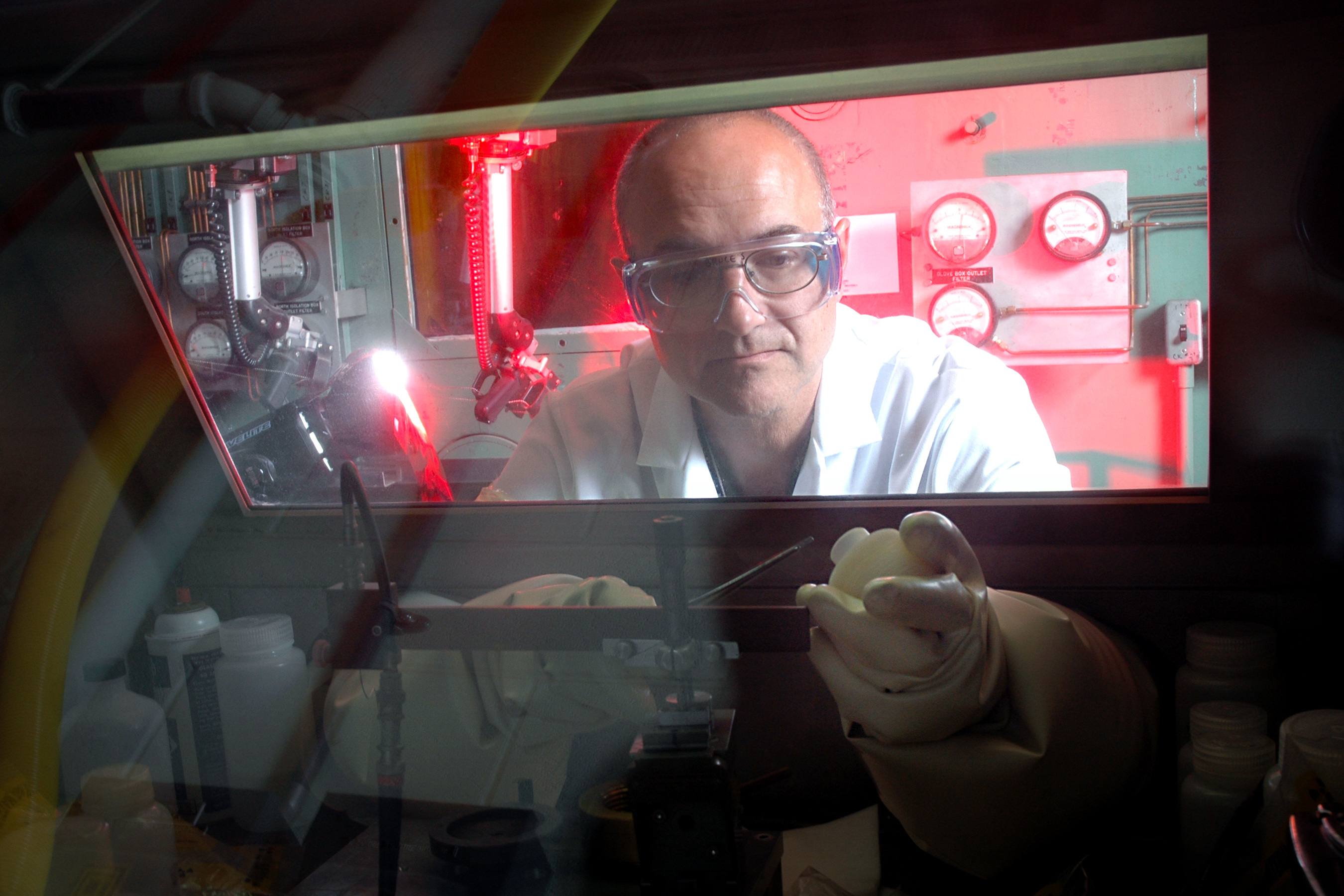
Glovebox

Radiochemistry is the chemistry of radioactive materials, where radioactive isotopes of elements are used to study the properties and chemical reactions of non-radioactive isotopes (often within radiochemistry the absence of radioactivity leads to a substance being described as being inactive as the isotopes are stable). Much of radiochemistry deals with the use of radioactivity to study ordinary chemical reactions. This is very different from radiation chemistry where the radiation levels are kept too low to influence the chemistry.

Radiochemistry includes the study of both natural and man-made radioisotopes.

== Main decay modes ==
All radioisotopes are unstable isotopes of elements— that undergo nuclear decay and emit some form of radiation. The radiation emitted can be of several types including alpha, beta, gamma radiation, proton, and neutron emission along with neutrino and antiparticle emission decay pathways.

1. α (alpha) radiation—the emission of an alpha particle (which contains 2 protons and 2 neutrons) from an atomic nucleus. When this occurs, the atom's atomic mass will decrease by 4 units and the atomic number will decrease by 2.

2. β (beta) radiation—the transmutation of a neutron into an electron and a proton. After this happens, the electron is emitted from the nucleus into the electron cloud.

3. γ (gamma) radiation—the emission of electromagnetic energy (such as gamma rays) from the nucleus of an atom. This usually occurs during alpha or beta radioactive decay.

These three types of radiation can be distinguished by their difference in penetrating power.

Alpha can be stopped quite easily by a few centimetres of air or a piece of paper and is equivalent to a helium nucleus. Beta can be cut off by an aluminium sheet just a few millimetres thick and are electrons. Gamma is the most penetrating of the three and is a massless chargeless high-energy photon. Gamma radiation requires an appreciable amount of heavy metal radiation shielding (usually lead or barium-based) to reduce its intensity.

== Activation analysis ==
By neutron irradiation of objects, it is possible to induce radioactivity; this activation of stable isotopes to create radioisotopes is the basis of neutron activation analysis. A high-energy most interesting object which has been studied in this way is the hair of Napoleon's head, which has been examined for its arsenic content.

A series of different experimental methods exist, these have been designed to enable the measurement of a range of different elements in different matrices. To reduce the effect of the matrix it is common to use the chemical extraction of the wanted element and/or to allow the radioactivity due to the matrix elements to decay before the measurement of the radioactivity. Since the matrix effect can be corrected by observing the decay spectrum, little or no sample preparation is required for some samples, making neutron activation analysis less susceptible to contamination.

The effects of a series of different cooling times can be seen if a hypothetical sample that contains sodium, uranium, and cobalt in a 100:10:1 ratio was subjected to a very short pulse of thermal neutrons. The initial radioactivity would be dominated by the ^{24}Na activity (half-life 15 h) but with increasing time the ^{239}Np (half-life 2.4 d after formation from parent ^{239}U with half-life 24 min) and finally the ^{60}Co activity (5.3 yr) would predominate.

== Biological and Medical applications ==
One biological application is the study of DNA using radioactive phosphorus-32. In these experiments, stable phosphorus is replaced by the chemically identical radioactive ^{32}P, and the resulting radioactivity is used in the analysis of the molecules and their behaviour.

Another example is the work that was done on the methylation of elements such as sulfur, selenium, tellurium, and polonium by living organisms. It has been shown that bacteria can convert these elements into volatile compounds, it is thought that methylcobalamin (vitamin B_{12}) alkylates these elements to create the dimethyls. It has been shown that a combination of Cobaloxime and inorganic polonium in sterile water forms a volatile polonium compound, while a control experiment that did not contain the cobalt compound did not form the volatile polonium compound. For the sulfur work, the isotope ^{35}S was used, while for polonium ^{207}Po was used. In some related work by the addition of ^{57}Co to the bacterial culture, followed by isolation of the cobalamin from the bacteria (and the measurement of the radioactivity of the isolated cobalamin) it was shown that the bacteria convert available cobalt into methylcobalamin.

In Nuclear Medicine PET (Positron Emission Tomography) scans are commonly used for diagnostic purposes, primarily in oncology and neurology. A radiative tracer, such as: FDG (Fluorodeoxyglucose) which is used in >90% of clinical PET scans, is injected intravenously into the patient and then taken to the PET scanner. The radioactive tracer releases radiation outward from the patient and the cameras in the machine interpret the radiation from the tracer. PET scan machines use solid state scintillation detection because of their high detection efficiency, NaI(Tl) crystals absorb the tracer's radiation and produce photons that get converted into an electrical signal for the machine, and later the diagnostic medical team to analyze.

== Environmental ==
Radiochemistry also includes the study of the behaviour of radioisotopes in the environment; for instance, a forest or grass fire can make radioisotopes mobile again. In these experiments, fires were started in the exclusion zone around Chernobyl and the radioactivity in the air downwind was measured.

A vast number of processes can release radioactivity into the environment. For example, the action of cosmic rays on the air is responsible for the formation of radioisotopes (such as ^{14}C and ^{32}P), the decay of ^{226}Ra forms ^{222}Rn which is a gas which can diffuse through rocks before entering buildings and dissolve in water and thus enter drinking water In addition, human activities such as bomb tests, accidents, and normal releases from industry have resulted in the release of radioactivity.

=== Chemical form of the actinides ===
The environmental chemistry of some radioactive elements such as plutonium is complicated by the fact that solutions of this element can undergo disproportionation and as a result, many different oxidation states can coexist at once. Some work has been done on the identification of the oxidation state and coordination number of plutonium and the other actinides under different conditions. This includes work on both solutions of relatively simple complexes and work on colloids Two of the key matrixes are soil/rocks and concrete, in these systems the chemical properties of plutonium have been studied using methods such as EXAFS and XANES.

=== Movement of colloids ===
While binding of a metal to the surfaces of the soil particles can prevent its movement through a layer of soil, it is possible for the particles of soil that bear the radioactive metal can migrate as colloidal particles through the soil. This has been shown to occur using soil particles labeled with ^{134}Cs, these are able to move through cracks in the soil.

==== Normal background ====
Radioactivity is present everywhere on Earth since its formation. According to the International Atomic Energy Agency, one kilogram of soil typically contains the following amounts of the following three natural radioisotopes 370 Bq ^{40}K (typical range 100–700 Bq), 25 Bq ^{226}Ra (typical range 10–50 Bq), 25 Bq ^{238}U (typical range 10–50 Bq) and 25 Bq ^{232}Th (typical range 7–50 Bq).

=== Action of microorganisms ===
The action of micro-organisms can fix uranium; Thermoanaerobacter can use chromium(VI), iron(III), cobalt(III), manganese(IV), and uranium(VI) as electron acceptors while acetate, glucose, hydrogen, lactate, pyruvate, succinate, and xylose can act as electron donors for the metabolism of the bacteria. In this way, the metals can be reduced to form magnetite (Fe_{3}O_{4}), siderite (FeCO_{3}), rhodochrosite (MnCO_{3}), and uraninite (UO_{2}). Other researchers have also worked on the fixing of uranium using bacteria , Francis R. Livens et al. (Working at Manchester) have suggested that the reason why Geobacter sulfurreducens can reduce UO^{2+}_{2} cations to uranium dioxide is that the bacteria reduce the uranyl cations to UO^{+}_{2} which then undergoes disproportionation to form UO^{2+}_{2} and UO_{2}. This reasoning was based (at least in part) on the observation that NpO^{+}_{2} is not converted to an insoluble neptunium oxide by the bacteria.

== Education ==
Despite the growing use of nuclear medicine, the potential expansion of nuclear power plants, and worries about protection against nuclear threats and the management of the nuclear waste generated in past decades, the number of students opting to specialize in nuclear and radiochemistry has decreased significantly over the past few decades. Now, with many experts in these fields approaching retirement age, action is needed to avoid a workforce gap in these critical fields, for example by building student interest in these careers, expanding the educational capacity of universities and colleges, and providing more specific on-the-job training.

Nuclear and radiochemistry (NRC) is mostly being taught at the university level, usually first at the master- and PhD-degree level. In Europe, substantial effort is being done to harmonize and prepare the NRC education for the industry's and society's future needs. This effort is being coordinated in projects funded by the Coordinated Action supported by the European Atomic Energy Community's 7th Framework Program: The CINCH-II project - Cooperation in education and training In Nuclear Chemistry.
