= Curie Institute (Paris) =

French scientific research center

Coordinates: 48°50′36″N 2°20′39″E

Institut Curie
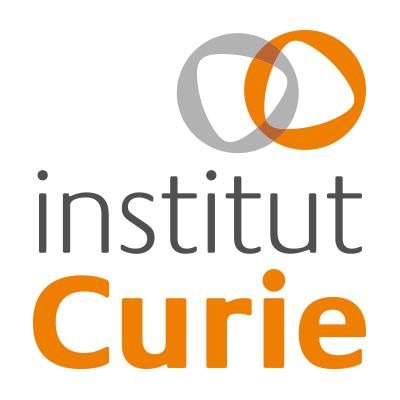
- Formation: 1920; 106 years ago
- Type: Governmental organisation
- Purpose: Fundamental research
- Headquarters: 26 rue d'Ulm 75005 Paris
- Official language: French
- President: Thierry Philip
- Website: institut-curie.org

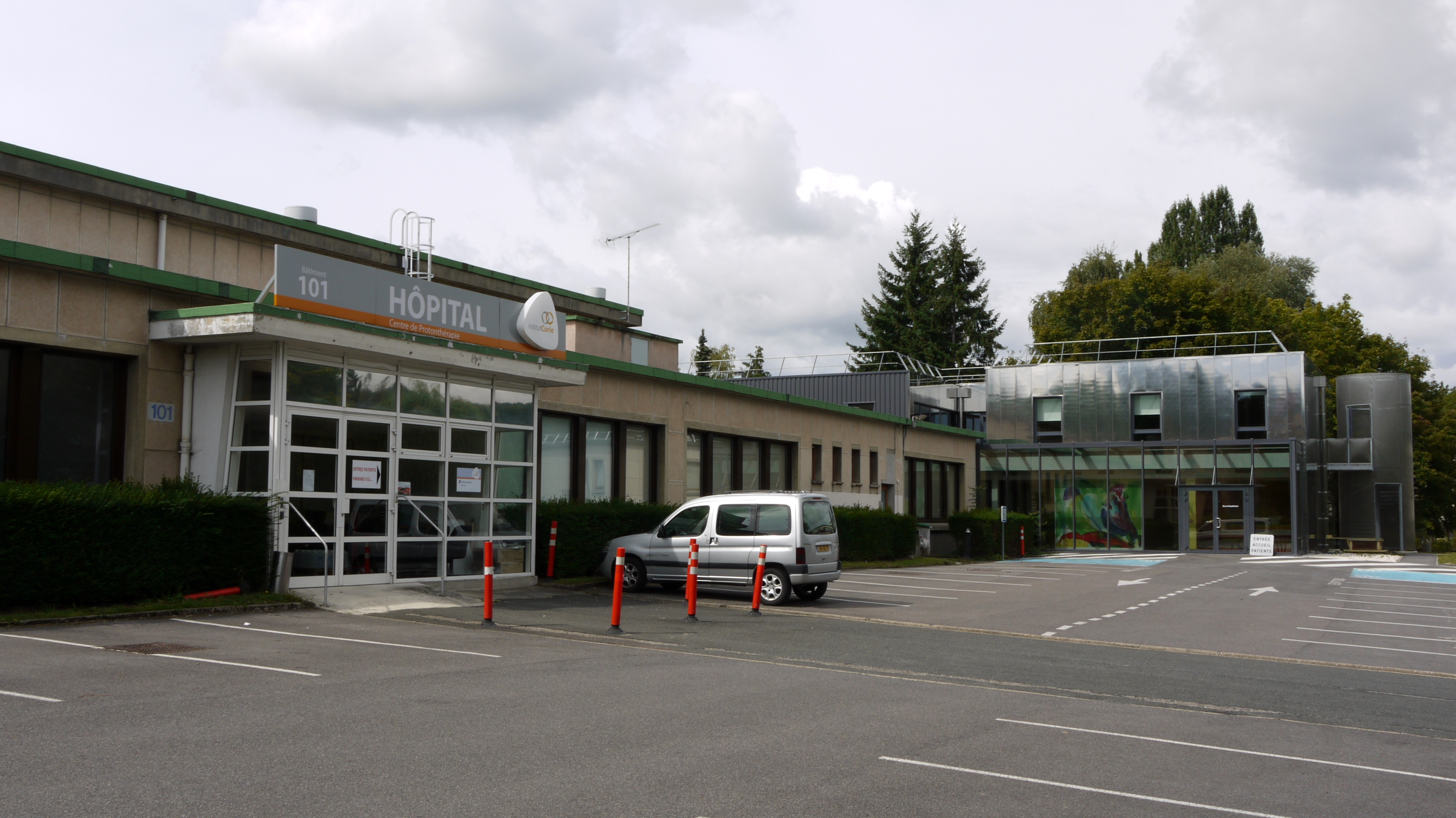
Centre of protontherapy

Institut Curie is a medical, biological and biophysical research centre in France. It is a private non-profit foundation operating a research centre on biophysics, cell biology and oncology and a hospital specialising in treatment of cancer. It is located in Paris, France.

Institut Curie is member of EU-LIFE, an alliance of leading life sciences research centres in Europe.

== Research ==
The institute now operates several research units in cooperation with national research institutions CNRS and INSERM. There are several hundred research staff at the institute. Institut Curie does not offer undergraduate degrees, but awards PhDs and employs many postdoctoral students alongside its permanent staff. Institut Curie is a constituent college (associate member) of University PSL.

== Hospital ==
Institut Curie runs the Hôpital Claudius Régaud, a hospital specialising in treating cancer. The institute also operates the proton therapy center at Orsay, one of the few such facilities in the world.

== History ==
The Institut du Radium, a giant laboratory for Marie Skłodowska–Curie, was founded in 1909 by the University of Paris and Institut Pasteur. The Institut du Radium had two sections. The Curie laboratory, directed by Maria Skłodowska-Curie, was dedicated to physics and chemistry research. The Curies' daughter Irène entered the Institute in March 1918 and headed it from 1946 until her death in 1956. The Pasteur laboratory, directed by Claudius Regaud, studied the biological and medical effects of radioactivity. After receiving a joint Nobel Prize with her husband Pierre in 1903, Maria Skłodowska-Curie won a second Nobel Prize for Chemistry in 1911. During World War One, Skłodowska-Curie used it to teach nurses about radiology.

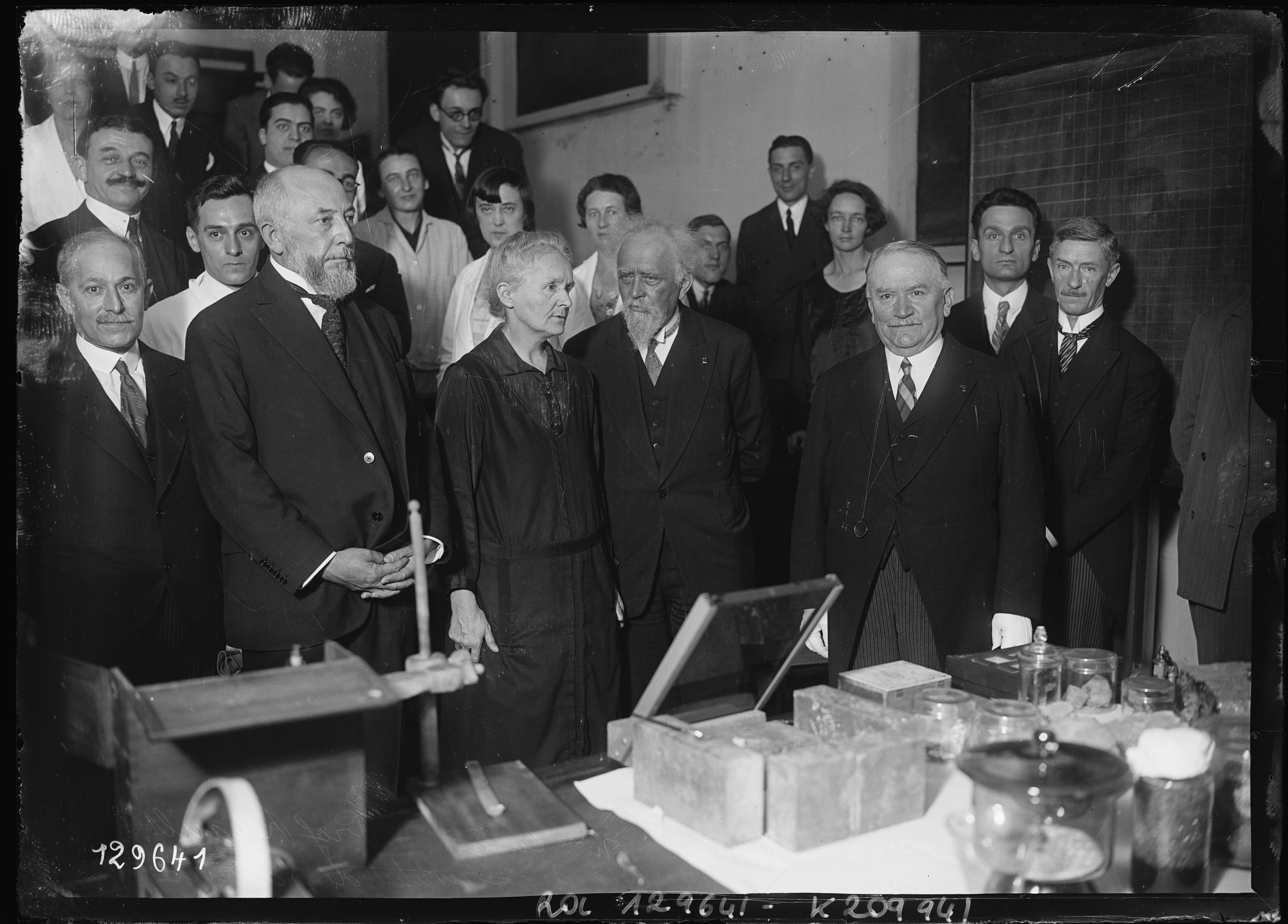
At the institute on 4 June 1928: From left in front: Claudius Regaud, Marie Curie, Jean Perrin and Gaston Doumergue.

Maria Skłodowska-Curie and Claudius Regaud established the Foundation Curie in 1920, a public interest institution. The Foundation's purpose was to fund the Institut du Radium's activities and contribute to the development of its therapeutic component. A first hospital opened in 1922. At the clinic, Regaud and his team developed innovative treatments combining surgery and radiation therapy to treat cancer. The Curie Foundation became a model for cancer centres around the world. Curie laboratory continued to play an important role in physics and chemistry research. In 1934, Skłodowska-Curie's daughter Irène and her son-in-law Frédéric Joliot-Curie discovered artificial radioactivity. In 1935, it was recognised with a Nobel Prize in Chemistry. The Institut du Radium and the Fondation Curie merged in 1970 to become the Institut Curie. The Institut has three missions: research, teaching and treating cancer. The original building of Curie's Laboratory from 1914 now houses the Musée Curie.

== Nobel Laureates and female scientists mentorship ==
Six Nobel prizes laureates (and four Nobel prizes) are attached to the Institute's researchers.

- Maria Skłodowska-Curie, Physics, 1903 - becoming the first ever woman awarded the Nobel Prize
- Maria Skłodowska-Curie. Chemistry, 1911 - becoming the only person in the world awarded two Nobel Prizes in two different sciences (Peace prize excluded), originally the first person and, to this day, the first and only woman with two Nobel Prizes cf. Statistics on the Nobel Prize
- Pierre Curie, Physics, 1903 - making the Curies the first married couple to both receive the Nobel Prize
- Irène Joliot-Curie, Chemistry, 1935 - becoming the only mother-daughter and sole father-daughter pair in the world to have received a Nobel Prize
- Frédéric Joliot-Curie, Chemistry, 1935 - making of the Curie Institute the only research centre in the world with two wife-and-husband research couples awarded with the Nobel Prize
- Pierre-Gilles de Gennes, Physics, 1991

43% of all scientific women Nobel prize laureates from France (three prizes out of seven received by French women in "hard" sciences and economics) received them for research conducted at Institut Curie or its predecessor the Radium Institute. If economics - a social science - is excluded, 50% (3 Nobel Prizes out of 6) received by French scientific women are affiliated to the Curie Institute.

Curie mentored upwards of 45 scientific women from all over the world including Marguerite Perey, discoverer of francium (five-time nominee for the Nobel Prize in Chemistry), and Jeanne Ferrier, discoverer of autoradiography. Others included: Sonia Cotelle, Harriet Brooks, Alice Leigh-Smith, Eva Ramstedt, Lucie Blanquiès, Suzanne Veil, Catherine Chamié, Alicja Dorabialska, Ellen Gleditsch, Marthe Weiss, Antonia Elisabeth Korvezee, May Sybil Leslie, Ștefania Mărăcineanu, Branca Edmée Marques, Éliane Montel, Elizabeth Rona, Jadwiga Szmidt, Margarete von Wrangell, Renée Galabert, Isabelle Archinard, and Curie's secretary of over 30 years: Léonie Razet.

The Radium Institute also pioneered mobile radiography during World War I where upwards of 150 proto-nurses (a nursing diploma was only introduced in France in 1922) and radiology pioneers were trained.

== Famous alumni ==
- Maria Skłodowska-Curie
- Claudius Regaud
- Irène Joliot-Curie
- Frédéric Joliot-Curie
- Pierre-Gilles de Gennes
- Marguerite Perey
- Jeanne Ferrier
- Ștefania Mărăcineanu
- Raymond Grégoire
- Eric M. Furst

== See also ==
- List of women associated with Marie Curie and Irène Joliot-Curie
