= Skłodowski family =

Polish noble family

The Skłodowski (originally Skłot, later also Skłotowski) family is a Polish noble family (Polish: Skłodowscy), members of whom variously used the Jastrzębiec and Dołęga coats of arms.

== History ==
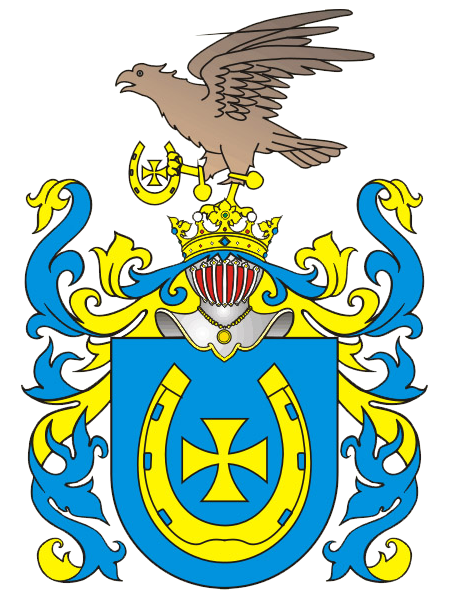
Jastrzębiec coat of arms, used by some members of the Skłodowski family

Dołęga coat of arms, used by some members of the Skłodowski family

The Skłodowski family originated in the village of Skłoty (now Skłóty) in Mazovia's Płock land. The earliest recorded family member was Velislaus (Welisław) de Sclothowo, who appeared in the Łęczyca court book on 20 June 1391. In the 16th century a family branch using the surname Krasznicki seu (Latin: "or") Sclothowski settled in the village of Kraśnica in Konin County. Descendants of this branch later appeared in Lviv County and the Duchy of Siewierz. They used the surname Sarnowski. In the 17th century another branch settled in Vitebsk Province of the Grand Duchy of Lithuania.

In the 15th and 16th centuries a substantial part of the family moved to empty areas of Podlasie and Mazovia, establishing noble villages (zaścianki). From the 16th century the Skłodowski family of the Jastrzębiec coat of arms lived in the villages of Skłody-Borowe, Skłody Wróble, and Skłody Ziemianie in Podlasie. Another branch settled in Mazovia's Nur land, in the villages of Skłody-Stachy, Skłody-Średnie, and Skłody-Piotrowięta, next to each other along the Brok River near Zaręby Kościelne. This branch used the Dołęga coat of arms.

This was typical petty szlachta (nobility) who farmed the land and sustained themselves mainly by their own labor. In the mid-17th century, Maciej Skłodowski, who originated from Skłody-Piotrowięta, achieved a higher standing. A distinguished soldier, he acquired the village of Rząśnik and, on marrying Agnieszka Ponikowska, also came into possession of the villages of Ponikiew Wielka and Ponikiew Mała. He engaged in a prolonged legal dispute over these estates with Ludwik Zieliński, starost of Ciechanów. His son Seweryn, having no heirs, in 1706 donated the estate for charitable purposes and to family members and asked to be buried beneath the threshold of the church in Goworowo.

Maciej Skłodowski had a brother, Jakub, who had a son, Seweryn Skłodowski. Seweryn and his descendants lived in Skłody-Piotrowięta. His great-great-grandson was Urban Skłodowski, whose son was Józef Skłodowski, headmaster of the Lublin gymnasium (secondary school). Józef's son was biologist Władysław Skłodowski. Władysław's children, from his marriage to Bronisława Boguska, included physicians Józef Władysław Skłodowski and Bronisława Dłuska, educational activist Helena Skłodowska-Szalay, and physicist and Nobel laureate Maria Skłodowska-Curie.

== Maria Skłodowska-Curie family tree ==
Here is a list of notable members associated with Maria Skłodowska-Curie:

- Józef Skłodowski (educator)
  - Władysław Skłodowski (educator)
    - Józef Władysław Skłodowski (medical doctor)
    - Helena Skłodowska-Szalay (educator)
    - Bronisława Dłuska (physician) married to Kazimierz Dłuski (political activist)
    - Maria Skłodowska-Curie (physicist, Nobel laureate in Physics and Chemistry) married to Pierre Curie (physicist, Nobel laureate in Physics)
      - Ève Curie (writer), married to Henry Richardson Labouisse Jr. (diplomat, Peace Nobel laureate)
      - Irène Joliot-Curie, married to Frederic Joliot-Curie (both physicists, Nobel laureates in Chemistry)
        - Pierre Joliot (biologist)
        - Hélène Langevin-Joliot (physicist), married to Michel Langevin (physicist)
          - Yves Langevin (astrophysicist)

For Pierre Curie family, check Curie family.

== See also ==
- Coat of arms of the Polish–Lithuanian Commonwealth
- Maria Skłodowska-Curie

== Bibliography ==
- Kaczorowska, Teresa (2019). "Korzenie najsłynniejszej kobiety świata Marii Skłodowskiej-Curie na ziemi łomżyńskiej". In Frąckiewicz, Małgorzata Krystyna (ed.). Rody i rodziny Mazowsza i okolic. Źródła do badań genealogicznych.
- Lasocki, Zygmunt (1936). "Pochodzenie Marji Skłodowskiej-Curie". Miesięcznik Heraldyczny. XV (4–6).
- Sadaj, Henryk (1982). "Skłodowscy. Przodkowie i współcześni Marii Skłodowskiej Curie" [The Skłodowski Family: Ancestors and Contemporaries of Maria Skłodowska Curie]. Roczniki Humanistyczne (in Polish). XXX (2).
