= Władysław Skłodowski =

Polish biologist (1832–1902)

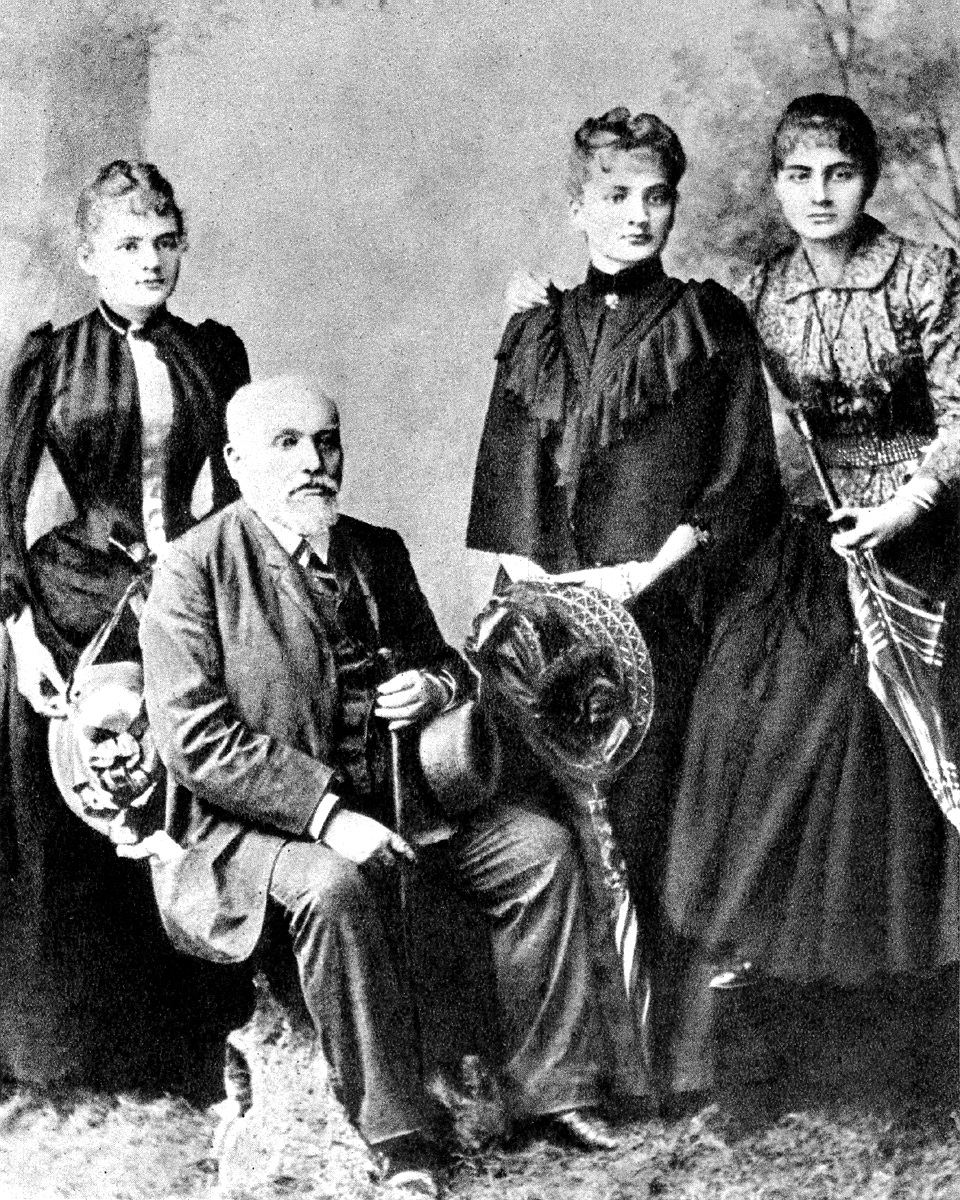
- Władysław Skłodowski and his daughters Maria, Bronisława and Helna
- Born: 10 October 1832; Kielce, Kraków Voivodeship, Congress Poland, Russian Empire
- Died: 14 May 1902 (aged 69); Warsaw, Congress Poland, Russian Empire
- Resting place: Powązki Cemetery, Warsaw
- Education: Saint Petersburg Imperial University
- Occupation: Educator
- Spouse: Bronisława Boguska
- Children: Zofia; Bronisława; Józef; Helena; Maria Salomea
- Parents: Józef Skłodowski; Salomea Sagtyńska
- Family: Skłodowski family

Władysław Skłodowski (10 October 1832 – 14 May 1902) was a Polish teacher, biologist, publicist, and translator. His daughter was Maria Skłodowska-Curie.

== Biography ==
Władysław Skłodowski as a gifted child was admitted to a gymnasium in Łuków at the age of 8. He completed his secondary education at a school in Siedlce in 1847, earning a gold medal. In 1852, earned a diploma in physical-mathematical sciences from the University of Saint Petersburg. Initially, he worked in Warsaw schools as a teacher of physics and mathematics. In 1867, he was promoted to deputy inspector of a II Government Gymnasium in Warsaw on Nowolipki Street, where he was also assigned a staff apartment. He held this role until 1873, when he was removed from the position. After that he established a boarding house for students, where he worked until 1887.

In 1871, his wife Bronisława's health deteriorated, revealing the first signs of tuberculosis, and she had to resign from her position as the director of the girls' school. She spent her time at home, taking care of the children and earning extra money by repairing shoes. Soon her health worsened, and she began to frequently travel abroad for treatment, including to Innsbruck and Nice. The burden of raising the children fell on Władysław, as both parents placed great importance on their children's education. In 1874, two daughters, Zofia and Bronisława, contracted typhus, and the eldest, Zofia, died in 1876. On May 9, 1878, his wife Bronisława also died. In 1881, seeking means to support his family, he purchased the Grzywacz milling settlement. However, the mill soon burned down, and Skłodowski suffered losses on the entire venture.

He retired in 1887, and a year later, he became the director of a reformatory in Studzieniec, where he served until 1889. At the same time he also worked at a secret school for girls run by Stefania Sempołowska. He then lived with his daughter Maria before her departure to Paris, and later with his son Józef. He died on May 14, 1902.

Skłodowski published in the weekly Wszechświat and the Dziennik Powszechny. He knew many foreign languages: French, English, German, Russian, Latin, and Greek, and translated works by Charles Dickens, Ivan Turgenev, and Henry Wadsworth Longfellow into Polish. He authored a zoology textbook and contributed over 30 entries in the field of botany to Samuel Orgelbrand’s universal encyclopedia.

== Family ==
Władysław was a Polish nobleman, member of the Skłodowski family of the Dołęga coat of arms. He was born in 1832 to Józef Skłodowski and Salomea Sagtyńska. His parents had six other children: Bolesława, Bronisława, Przemysław, Zdzisław, Wisława, and Wanda.

On July 3, 1860, he married noblewoman Bronisława Marianna Boguska, of the Topór coat of arms, in Warsaw in the Visitation of the Blessed Virgin Mary. The couple had five children: Zofia, Józef, Bronisława, Helena, and Maria.

== Bibliography ==
- Kaczorowska, Teresa (2011). Córka mazowieckich równin, czyli Maria Skłodowska-Curie z Mazowsza. Ciechanów.
- Sadaj, Henryk (1982). "Skłodowscy. Przodkowie i współcześni Marii Skłodowskiej Curie" [The Skłodowski Family: Ancestors and Contemporaries of Maria Skłodowska Curie]. Roczniki Humanistyczne (in Polish). XXX (2).
