= Bronisława Dłuska =

Polish physician, first director of the Radium-Institut in Warsaw

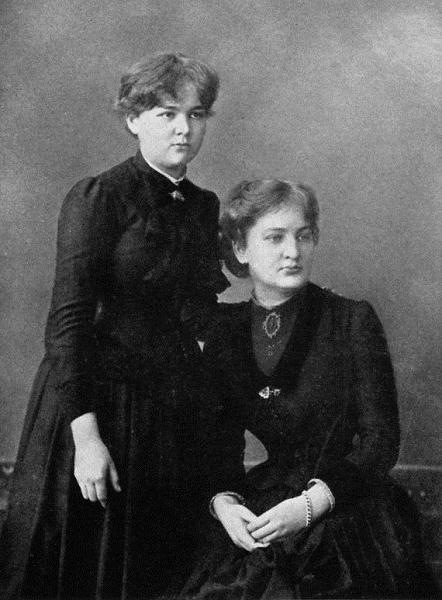
- Bronisława Dłuska (right) with sister Maria, c. 1886
- Born: Bronisława Skłodowska; 28 March 1865; Warsaw, Congress Poland, Russian Empire
- Died: 15 April 1939 (aged 74); Warsaw, Second Polish Republic
- Occupation: Physician
- Spouse: Kazimierz Dłuski (m. 1890; died 1930)
- Children: Helena Dłuska (1892—1921); Jakub Dłuski (c. 1896/97—1903)
- Awards: Order of Polonia Restituta, Gold Cross of Merit, Medal of Independence
- Scientific career
- Education: University of Paris
- Alma mater: University of Paris
- Known for: Co-founder and first director of Maria Skłodowska-Curie Institute of Oncology, Warsaw
- Fields: Medicine, Oncology
- Workplaces: Maria Skłodowska-Curie Institute of Oncology

Bronisława Dłuska (Polish pronunciation: [brɔɲiˈswava ˈdwuska]; née Skłodowska; 28 March 1865 – 15 April 1939) was a Polish physician, and co-founder and first director of Warsaw's Maria Skłodowska-Curie Institute of Oncology.

She was married to political activist Kazimierz Dłuski, and was an older sister of physicist Marie Curie.

== Life ==
=== Early life ===
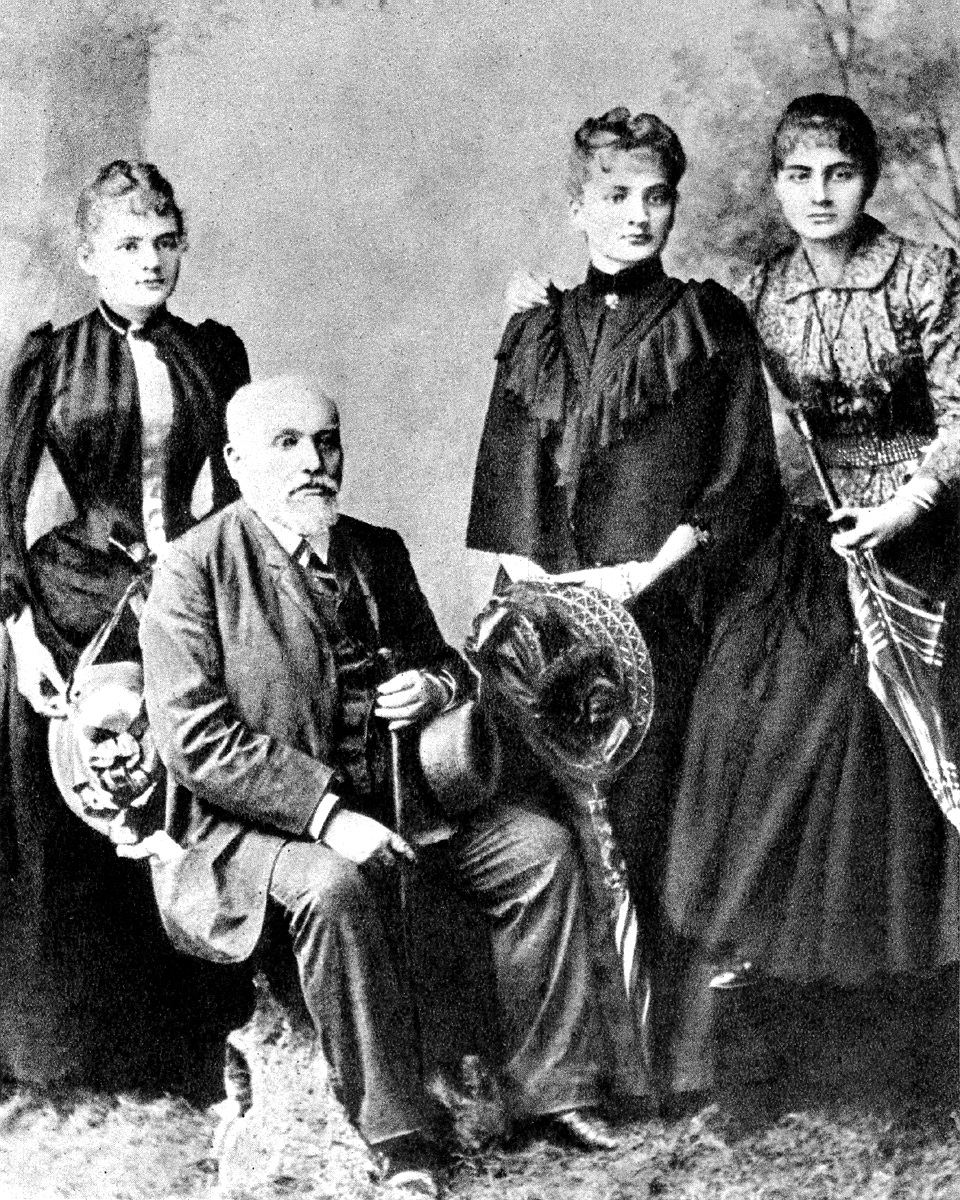
Bronisława Dłuska (centre right) with father Władysław Skłodowski and sisters Marie (left) and Helena (right), 1890

Bronisława was born 28 March 1865 in Warsaw to Władysław Skłodowski and Bronisława Skłodowska, both of whom were teachers. The second eldest of five children, she had three sisters—Zofia, Helena, and Maria—and a brother, Józef.

On both the paternal and maternal sides, the family had lost their property and fortunes through patriotic involvements in Polish national uprisings aimed at restoring Poland's independence (the most recent had been the January Uprising of 1863–65). This left the subsequent generation to a difficult struggle to get ahead in life.

Her paternal grandfather, Józef Skłodowski, had been a respected teacher in Lublin, where he taught the young Bolesław Prus, who would become a leading figure in Polish literature. Her father, Władysław Skłodowski, taught mathematics and physics, and was also director of two Warsaw gymnasia for boys. After Russian authorities eliminated laboratory instruction from the Polish schools, he brought much of the laboratory equipment home, and instructed his children in its use.

The father was eventually fired by his Russian supervisors for pro-Polish sentiments, and forced to take lower-paying posts; the family also lost money on a bad investment, and eventually chose to supplement their income by lodging boys in the house. Her mother, Bronisława, operated a prestigious Warsaw boarding school for girls; she resigned from the position after Maria was born. She died of tuberculosis in May 1878, when the young Bronisława was only 13 years old, leaving the teenager, now the eldest woman in the family, to care for Helena, Maria, and Józef. Less than three years earlier, Bronisława's older sister, Zofia, had died of typhus contracted from a boarder.

=== Education and life in Paris ===
In 1882 Bronisława graduated from secondary school with a gold medal. Unable to study at institutions of higher learning that did not admit women, she joined the underground Floating University, founded by Jadwiga Szczawińska-Dawidowa. Bronisława undertook tutoring to fund her future studies. At age 19 she left for Paris, where she studied medicine at the Sorbonne. Maria helped her sister financially, under an agreement that Maria would help Bronisława during her medical studies, in exchange for similar assistance when Maria went to study in Paris.

In 1890 Bronisława graduated as a gynaecologist-obstetrician and married political exile and fellow-physician Kazimierz Dłuski. The couple were active in the local community; she ran a medical clinic, many of her clients being workers and their families, and the couple's apartment functioned as a "culture salon" for Polish exiles, immigrants, and expatriates.

At her sister's insistence, Maria joined the couple in Paris in 1891 to start her own studies at the Sorbonne. Maria lived with them for a time before renting a garret closer to the university than Bronisława's apartment - a one-hour carriage ride distant.

Bronisława and Kazimierz had a daughter, Helena, in 1892, then a son, Jakub, a few years later.

=== Return to Poland ===
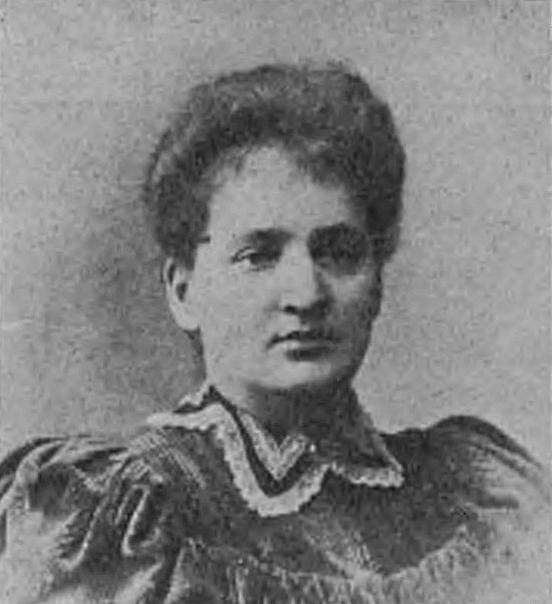
Bronisława Dłuska, before 1901

She and Kazimierz returned to Poland in 1898 to set up a pulmonological sanitarium in the southern, Tatra Mountains resort town of Zakopane. Kazimierz was not permitted to travel to the Russian partition of Poland.

Beginning in early August 1914, one of Zakopane's notable World War I visitors was the Polish-born English-language novelist Joseph Conrad, who took refuge there with his family. The patriotic Bronisława Dłuska scolded him for using his great literary talent for purposes other than bettering the future of his native Poland, which Conrad had left at age 16.

After World War I, Poland regained its independence, and Kazimierz joined the Polish delegates at the 1919 Versailles Peace Conference.

Now free to return to a Warsaw no longer under Russian rule, the Dłuskis set up a tuberculosis preventorium in the Warsaw suburb of Anin.

Following the successful opening of the first Radium Institute in Paris in 1918, Maria, now known by her adopted French given name of Marie, began work setting up a second Radium Institute in Warsaw. Building began in 1925 with the laying of the foundation stone of the Warsaw Radium Institute, with Bronisława to be its director. She supervised the construction and recruitment, while Marie raised funds in the United States and elsewhere, and despite the death of Kazimierz in 1930, Bronisława continued to run and oversee the creation of the facility. On 29 May 1932, the Institute was officially opened, with Bronisława as the first director.

=== Death ===
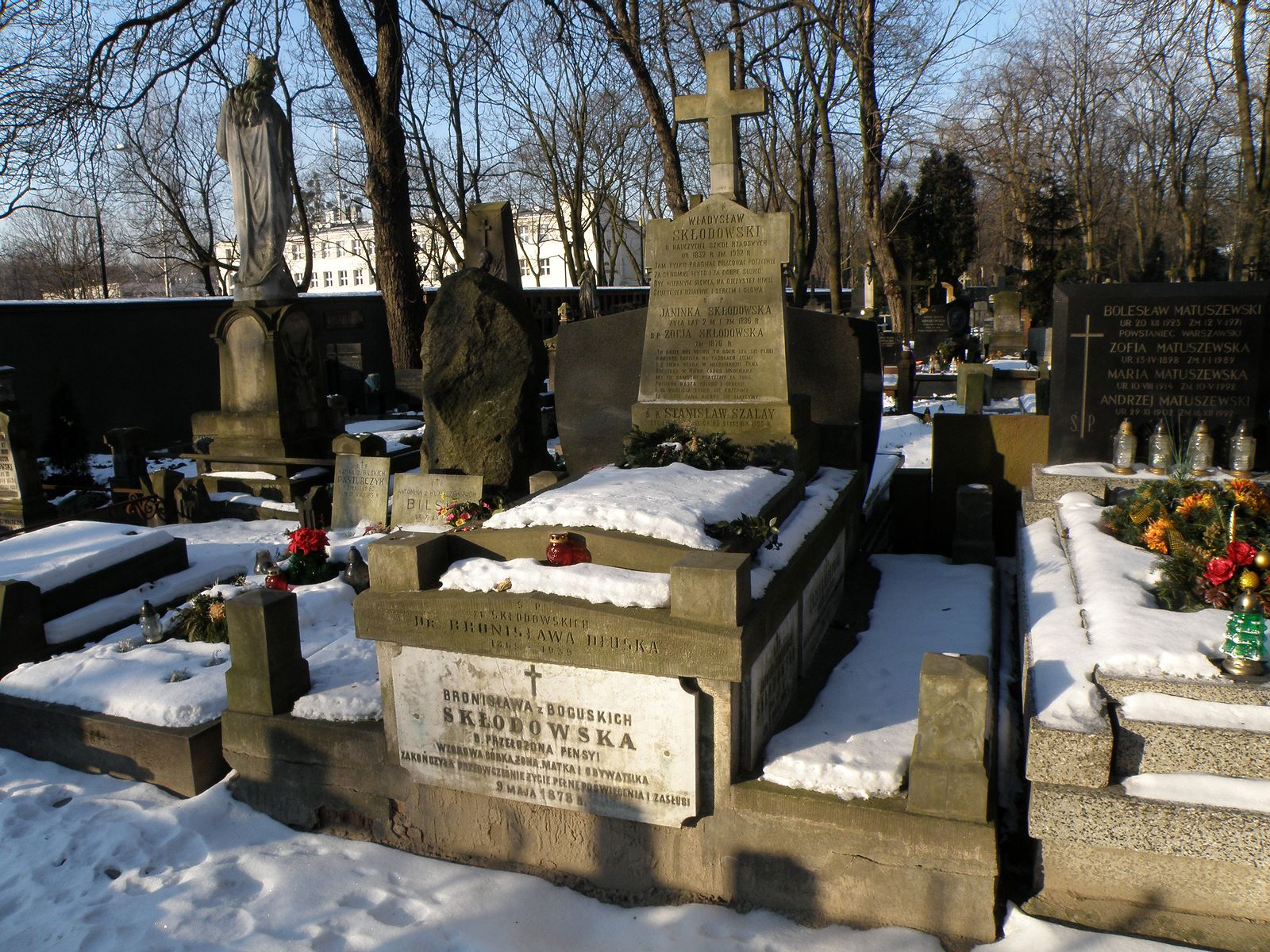
Skłodowski family tomb in Warsaw

On 15 April 1939, Bronisława died of natural causes, aged 74. She is interred in the family tomb with her parents, her sisters Zofia and Helena, and her brother Józef.
