= Sancellemoz =

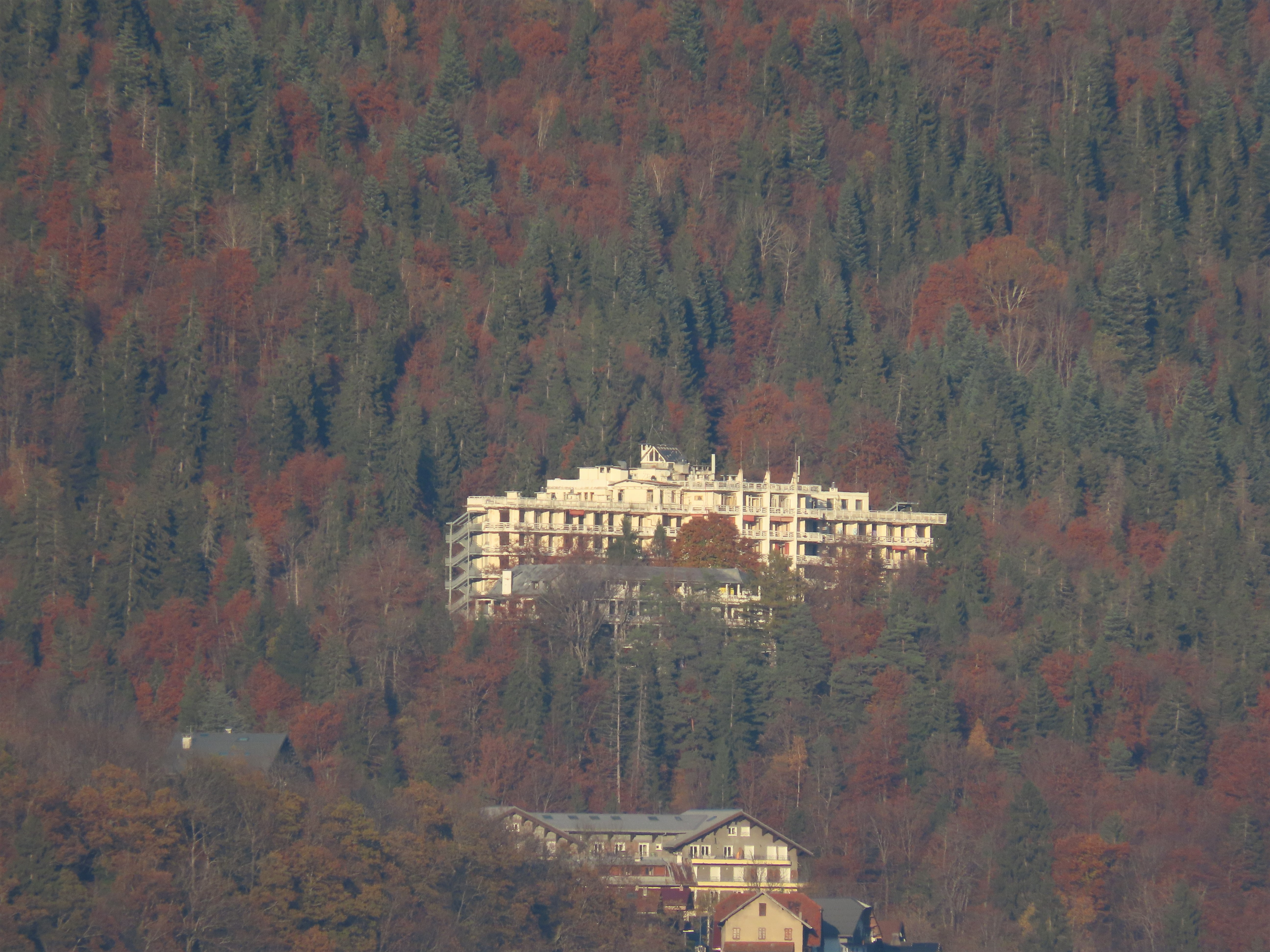
- The sanatorium in 2024

Geography
- Location: Passy, Haute-Savoie, France
- Coordinates: 45.93817°N 6.70582°E

Organisation
- Type: Specialist

Services
- Speciality: Sanatorium

Links
- Lists: Hospitals in France

Sancellemoz is a sanatorium in the town of Passy, in Haute-Savoie, eastern France. Professor Marie Curie died in the sanatorium Sancellemoz.
