= Jadwiga Sikorska =

Polish educator (1846–1927)

Jadwiga Sikorska (20 September 1846–20 December 1927) was a Polish educator, philanthropist, founder, and long-time superior of the women's boarding school in Warsaw. On 2 May 1923, she was awarded the Knight's Cross of the Order of Polonia Restituta "for many years of zealous professional work".

== Early life and education ==
Jadwiga Sikorska was born on 20 September 1846 in Warsaw, the fourth of six children of musician Józef Sikorski and Maria née Chrzanowska. Initially, she was educated at home, and then at the secret boarding school of Julia Bąkowska (later wife of Ignacy Baranowski). She then graduated from the six-grade Higher School for Girls (founded in 1859). In the 1863/1864 school year, she completed a one-year pedagogical course at the Alexandrian-Mariyan Institute for the Education of Girls on Wiejska Street and earned a certificate entitling her to teach Polish in private and government secondary schools.

== Career ==
For a year she was a private teacher in the Koskowski family's house in Chrzesne near Warsaw. From 1866, she was a teacher at Paulina Krakowowa's boarding school for eight years.

In June 1874, she obtained permission to open a private boarding school for girls. She immediately began organising the school, and on 3 September 1874, Warsaw City School Inspector Nikolai Hornberg officially opened "Jadwiga Sikorska's private boarding school with a course of government-run girls' secondary schools". The next day, classes began at the school. Five years later, Sikorska obtained permission to open a fifth grade, and in 1882, a sixth grade. Fifteen years later it was granted permission for the seventh grade, and in 1917, for the eighth grade.

From the very beginning of the boarding school's operation, Sikorska organised secret upper-secondary classes, where Polish was the language of instruction. This was during a period of intensified Russification, led by curator Aleksandr Apuchtin from 1879 to 1897. The school was subject to inspections and searches, during which Russian inspectors, however, discovered nothing. Every year, she prepared two lesson plans. The first was the official one, intended for the Russian authorities, and the second was intended for the school's internal needs. It included instruction in Polish, history, and geography of Poland.

Although Sikorska had a traditionalist approach to teaching, she introduced new subjects in her school. Students studied, among other things, elocution, hygiene, selected aspects of law, economics and sociology, cosmography, local history, and human anatomy. Sikorska's boarding school was considered a leading educational institution in Warsaw, with a high standard of teaching.

Throughout the period of its operation, it was home to people who made a mark on Polish history (especially science), including: Tadeusz Korzon, Jan Kucharzewski, Władysław Smoleński, Piotr Chmielowski , Teodora Męczkowska, and Leopold Otto.

Thanks to Sikorska and the teaching staff, a spirit of tolerance, both religious and social, prevailed at the boarding school. The school did not focus on profit, and unlike other institutions of this type, it did not advertise in the press. Among the boarding school's students were Wanda Krahelska, Iza Moszczeńska, Helena Skłodowska-Szalay, and Maria Skłodowska-Curie.

In 1879, Sikorska was a member of the jury of a competition on youth education, announced by the Bluszcz magazine.

In 1882, she co-initiated the establishment of the Shelter for Teachers, served as a long-time member of its board, and later as honorary chairwoman of the Society for the Protection of the shelter. She also donated a significant sum of money for the construction of a shelter in Zielonka near Warsaw.

During the establishment of the Warsaw Public Library in 1907–1910, she donated a dozen or so books. The library received the remainder of her collection, approximately 800 volumes, in 1928 after her death.

By an act of 7 August 1918, she transferred her school, along with all its equipment and teaching aids, to the Ministry of Religious Denominations and Public Education. Jadwiga Sikorska remained the educational director and chairwoman of the examination board. She retired on 1 June 1927.

Jadwiga Sikorska died on 26 December 1927 and was buried in a family grave at the Powązki Cemetery (catacomb alley, grave 105/106).

== See also ==
- List of women associated with Marie Curie and Irène Joliot-Curie
