= Józef Skłodowski =

Polish educator (1804–1882)

- Born: 19 March 1804; Skłody-Piotrowice, New East Prussia, Kingdom of Prussia (now Poland)
- Died: 21 August 1882 (aged 78); Zawieprzyce, Congress Poland, Russian Empire
- Resting place: Cemetery in Kijany
- Education: University of Warsaw
- Occupation: Educator

Józef Skłodowski (19 March 1804 – 21 August 1882) was a Polish educator, librarian, participant in the November Uprising (1830–31), and grandfather of Maria Skłodowska-Curie.

== Life ==
Józef Skłodowski was born into a noble family in the family village of Skłody-Piotrowice, as the son of Urban Skłodowski and Elżbieta Małgorzata née Rykaczewska. He began his education in 1812 at an elementary school in Zaręby Kościelne. He completed his secondary education with the Piarists at the Voivedoship School in Łomża and graduated in 1828 from the Faculty of Philology at the University of Warsaw.

From the autumn of 1829, he worked as a teacher at the district school in Biała Podlaska, where he taught Polish, French, and German. He then transferred to a school in Warsaw. After the outbreak of the November Uprising, he joined the Polish army along with a group of students and actively participated in armed combat. After the uprising, he avoided repression and returned to his profession. He taught in schools in Kielce, Warsaw, Łomża, Łuków, and Siedlce, where, starting in 1849, he served as the director of the high school.

On 5 February 1832, he married Salomea Sagtyńska, the daughter of Aleksander and Julia née Michałowska. In 1837, he submitted an application to the Heraldic Office of the Kingdom of Poland to confirm his nobility and his right to the Dołęga coat of arms, which was subsequently confirmed.

In 1851, he became the director of the governorate gymnasium in Lublin. This position made him the supervisor of all schools in the Lublin Governorate. In 1859 Skłodowski initiated the construction of a new school building (now one of the buildings of the Faculty of Pedagogy and Psychology of UMCS on Narutowicz Street). Passionate about the natural sciences, he amassed a school library of ten thousand volumes, widely accessible to townspeople. He actively participated in the work on educational reform in the Kingdom of Poland, initiated by Aleksander Wielopolski. He submitted a memorandum to the authorities advocating for the modernization of elementary and secondary education.

He was held in high regard by the residents of Lublin and by his students, who included prominent figures such as Bolesław Prus, Aleksander Świętochowski, Julian Ochorowicz, Bronisław Znatowicz, Eugeniusz Dziewulski, Gustaw Doliński, Hipolit Wójcicki, and Henryk Wierciński. For his merits, he was awarded the title of State Councilor. He was prematurely retired in 1862 for not suppressing the revolutionary fervor among his students, ahead of the January Uprising.

After losing his position in Lublin, he moved with his family to Jawidz, a farm in the Zawieprzyce estate, which was leased by his cousin, Ksawery Skłodowski. Following the uprising, he relocated to Czyżew, near Ostrów Mazowiecka. In 1870, he moved to Rykoszyn near Kielce, which was the estate of his son-in-law, Henryk Felauer. He was elected community judge in nearby Promnik and mayor of the Piekoszów municipality.

In 1879, he bought two farms in Radlin near Kielce, where he lived with his wife in a wooden manor. Struggling to cope with the death of his beloved wife, Salomea Skłodowska, in 1882, he moved from Radlin to Zawieprzyce in the Lublin region, where he spent the final period of his life. He suffered from pneumonia and died in Zawieprzyce on 21 August 1882. His funeral took place on 25 August at the parish church in Kijany. Józef Skłodowski was buried in the family tomb at the parish cemetery in Kijany.

A commemorative plaque has been dedicated to him, embedded in the facade of the former provincial school building.

== Family ==
He was married to Salomea Sagtyńska (died 21 February 1882), and together they had seven children: Władysław, Zdzisław, Przemysław, Bolesława, Bronisława, Wanda, and Wisław Julia. Przemysław and Bronisława actively participated in the January Uprising, with Przemysław losing his life in a skirmish near Lubartów.

== Bibliography ==
- Sadaj, Henryk (1982). "Skłodowscy. Przodkowie i współcześni Marii Skłodowskiej Curie" [The Skłodowski Family: Ancestors and Contemporaries of Maria Skłodowska Curie]. Roczniki Humanistyczne (in Polish). XXX (2).
