= Marie Curie =

Polish-French physicist and chemist (1867–1934)

Marie Skłodowska-Curie
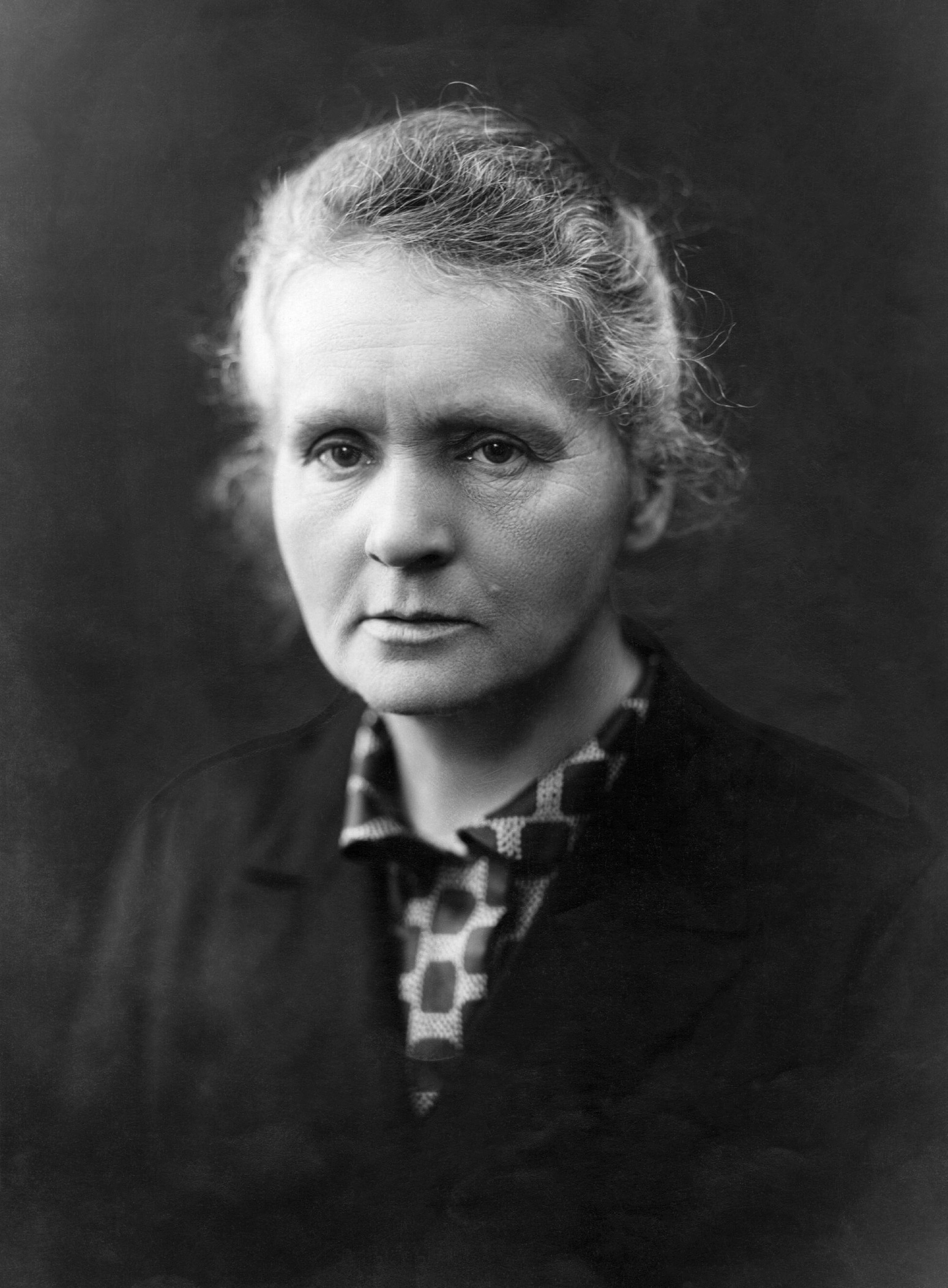
- Marie Skłodowska Curie, c. 1920
- Born: Maria Salomea Skłodowska; 7 November 1867; Warsaw, Congress Poland, Russian Empire
- Died: 4 July 1934 (aged 66); Passy, Haute-Savoie, France
- Cause of death: Aplastic anaemia
- Citizenship: Russian Empire (until 1895); France (from 1895)
- Education: University of Paris
- Known for: Discovering polonium and radium (with Pierre); Researching radioactivity
- Spouse: Pierre Curie (m. 1895; died 1906)
- Children: Irène; Ève
- Father: Władysław Skłodowski
- Family: Skłodowski (by birth); Curie (by marriage)
- Awards: Davy Medal (1903); Nobel Prize in Physics (1903); Matteucci Medal (1904); Actonian Prize (1907); Elliott Cresson Medal (1909); Albert Medal (1910); Nobel Prize in Chemistry (1911); Willard Gibbs Award (1921); John Scott Medal (1921); Cameron Prize for Therapeutics of the University of Edinburgh (1931)
- Scientific career
- Fields: Physics; Chemistry
- Workplaces: University of Paris; Institut du Radium; École normale supérieure; French Academy of Medicine; International Committee on Intellectual Cooperation
- Thesis: Recherches sur les substances radioactives (Research on Radioactive Substances) (1903)
- Doctoral advisor: Gabriel Lippmann
- Doctoral students: André-Louis Debierne; Gioacchino Failla; Ladislas Goldstein; Émile Henriot; Irène Joliot-Curie; Óscar Moreno; Marguerite Perey; Francis Perrin

Maria Salomea Skłodowska Curie (Note: Polish: [ˈmarja salɔˈmɛa skwɔˈdɔfska kiˈri]) (née Skłodowska; 7 November 1867 – 4 July 1934), better known as Marie Curie, (Note: /ˈkjʊəri/ KURE-ee; French: [maʁi kyʁi]) was a Polish and naturalised-French physicist and chemist. She shared the 1903 Nobel Prize in Physics with her husband, Pierre Curie, "for their joint researches on the radioactivity phenomena discovered by Professor Henri Becquerel". She won the 1911 Nobel Prize in Chemistry "[for] the discovery of the elements radium and polonium, by the isolation of radium and the study of the nature and compounds of this remarkable element".

Curie was the first woman to win a Nobel Prize, the first person to win a Nobel Prize twice and the only person to win a Nobel Prize in two different scientific fields. She and Pierre were the first married couple to win the Nobel Prize, launching the Curie family legacy of five Nobel Prizes. She was, in 1906, the first woman to become a professor at the University of Paris.

Curie was born in Warsaw, Russian Empire, where she studied at the clandestine Flying University and began her practical scientific training. In 1891, Curie followed her elder sister Bronisława to study in Paris, where she earned her higher degrees and conducted her subsequent scientific work. In 1895, Curie married Pierre, with whom she conducted pioneering research on radioactivity—a term she coined. Pierre died in 1906 in a Paris street accident.

Under Curie's direction, the world's first studies were conducted into the treatment of neoplasms by the use of radioactive isotopes. She founded the Curie Institute in Paris in 1920, and the Curie Institute in Warsaw in 1932; both remain major medical research centres. During the First World War, she developed mobile radiography units to provide X-ray services to field hospitals.

While a French citizen, Curie, who used both surnames, never lost her sense of Polish identity. She taught her daughters the Polish language and took them on visits to Poland. She named the first chemical element she and Pierre discovered polonium, after her native country. (Note: Poland had been partitioned in the 18th century among Russia, Prussia, and Austria, and it was Curie's hope that naming the element after her native country would bring world attention to Poland's lack of independence as a sovereign state. Polonium may have been the first chemical element named to highlight a political question.)

Curie died in 1934, aged 66, at the Sancellemoz sanatorium in Passy, Haute-Savoie, France, of aplastic anaemia likely from exposure to radiation in the course of her scientific research and in the course of her radiological work at field hospitals during the First World War. In addition to her Nobel Prizes, she received numerous other honours and tributes; in 1995, she became the first woman to be entombed on her own merits in the Paris Panthéon, and Poland declared 2011 the Year of Marie Curie during the International Year of Chemistry. Curie is the subject of numerous biographies, including Madame Curie by her daughter Ève. The synthetic element curium is named in her honour.

== Life and career ==
=== Early years ===
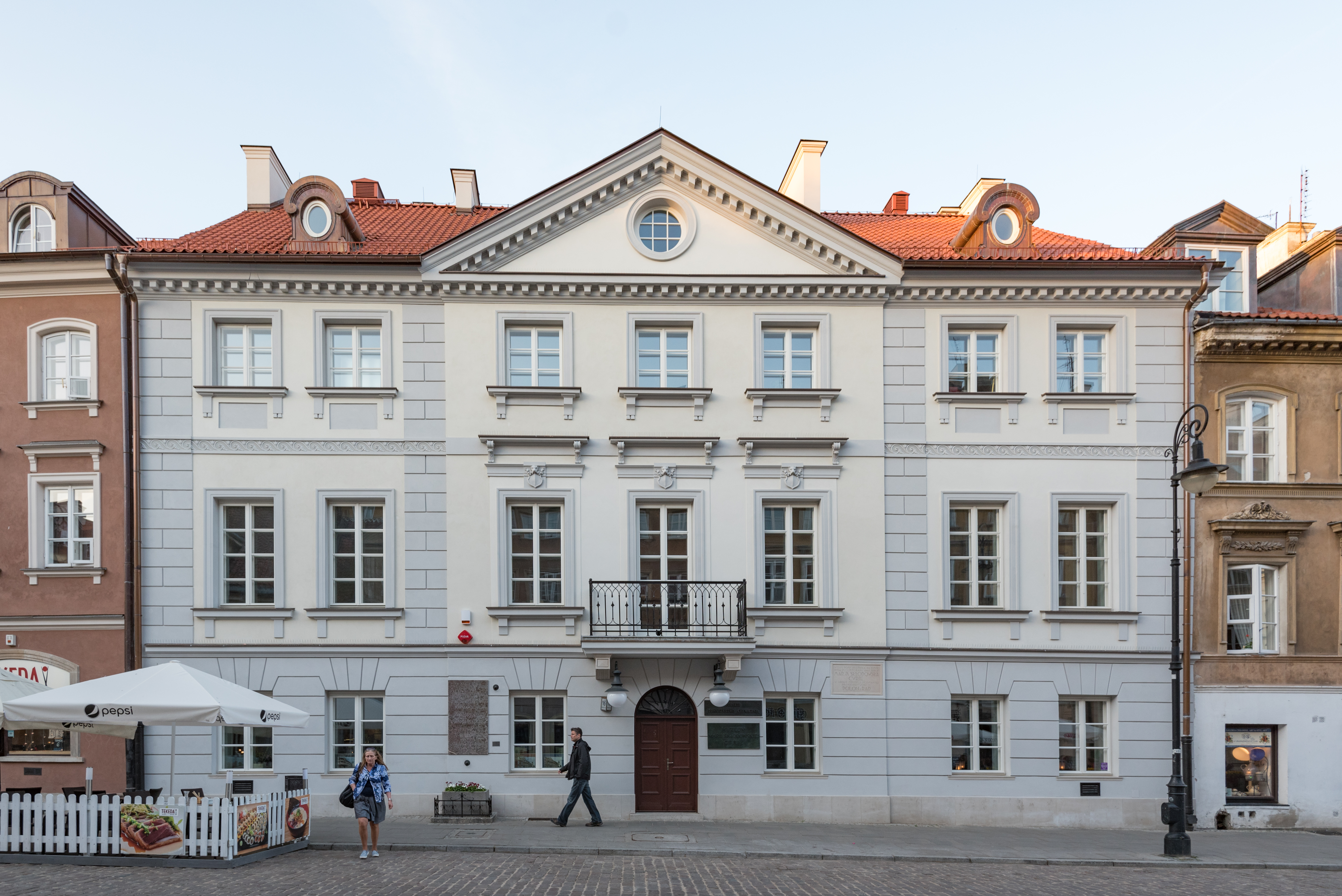
Curie's birthplace at 16 Freta Street in New Town, Warsaw

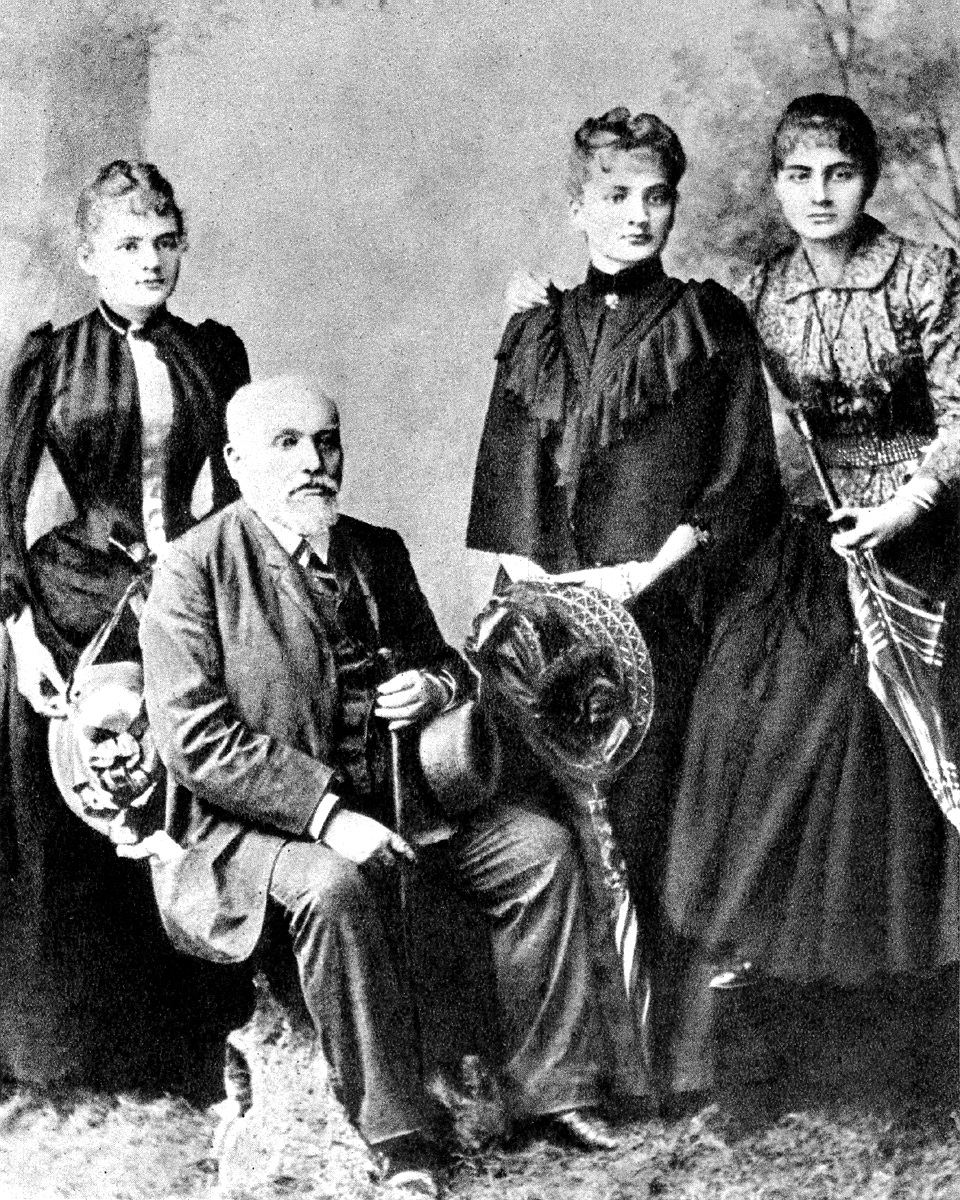
Władysław Skłodowski and daughters (from left) Maria, Bronisława, and Helena, 1890

Maria (nicknamed Mania) Salomea Skłodowska was born on 7 November 1867 in Warsaw, the capital of Congress Poland in the Russian Empire. She was the fifth and youngest child of teachers Bronisława (née Boguska) and Władysław Skłodowski. Her siblings were Zofia (born 1862, nicknamed Zosia), Józef (born 1863, nicknamed Józio), Bronisława (born 1865, nicknamed Bronia) and Helena (born 1866, nicknamed Hela).

On both the paternal and maternal sides, the family had lost their property and fortunes through patriotic involvements in Polish national uprisings aimed at restoring Poland's independence (the most recent had been the January Uprising of 1863–1865). This condemned the subsequent generation, including Maria and her elder siblings, to a difficult struggle to get ahead in life.

Władysław Skłodowski taught mathematics and physics, subjects that Maria was to pursue, and was also director of two Warsaw gymnasia (secondary schools) for boys. After Russian authorities eliminated laboratory instruction from the Polish schools, he brought much of the laboratory equipment home and instructed his children in its use. He was eventually fired by his Russian supervisors for pro-Polish sentiments and forced to take lower-paying posts; the family also lost money on a bad investment and eventually chose to supplement their income by lodging boys in the house. Maria's mother Bronisława operated a prestigious Warsaw boarding school for girls; she resigned from the position after Maria was born. She died of tuberculosis in May 1878, when Maria was ten years old. Less than three years earlier, Maria's oldest sibling, Zofia, had died of typhus contracted from a boarder. Maria's father was an atheist, her mother a devout Catholic. The deaths of Maria's mother and sister caused her to give up Catholicism and become agnostic.

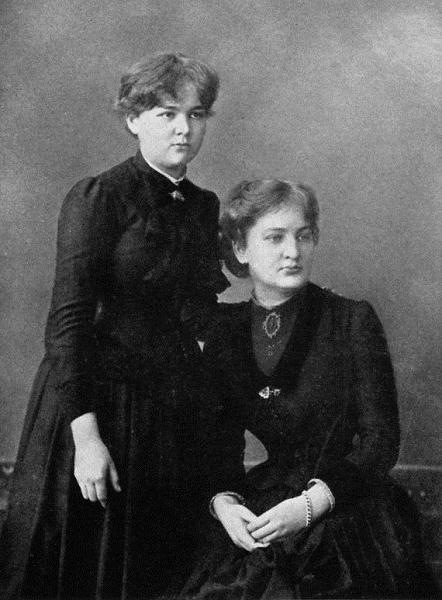
Maria (left) and sister Bronisława, c. 1886

When she was ten years old, Maria began attending J. Sikorska's boarding school; next she attended a gymnasium (secondary school) for girls, from which she graduated on 12 June 1883 with a gold medal. After a collapse, possibly due to depression, she spent the following year in the countryside with relatives of her father, and the next year with her father in Warsaw, where she did some tutoring. Unable to enrol in a regular institution of higher education because she was a woman, she and her sister Bronisława became involved with the clandestine Flying University (sometimes translated as "Floating University"), a Polish patriotic institution of higher learning that admitted women students.

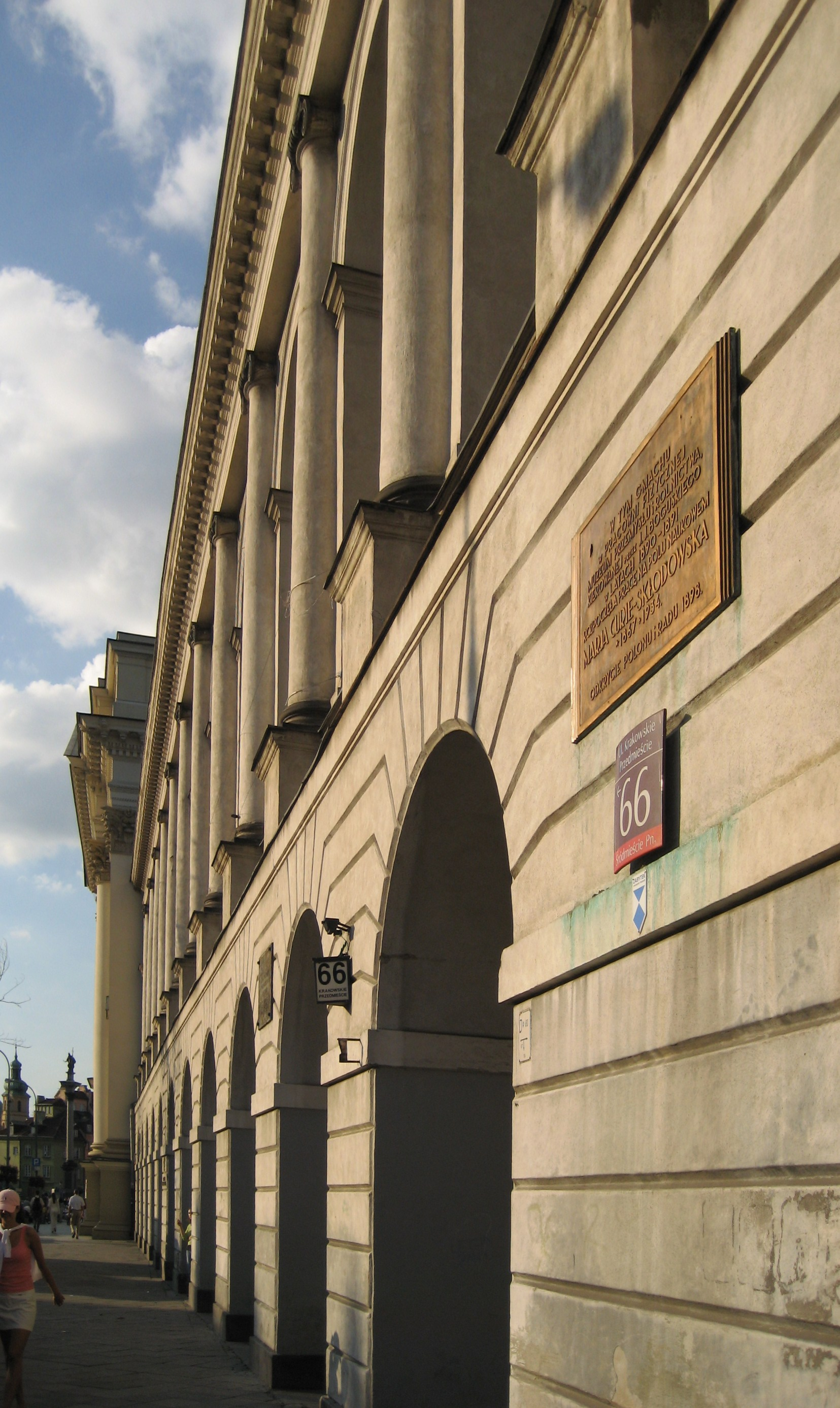
Krakowskie Przedmiescie 66, Warsaw, where Maria did her first scientific work, in 1890–1891

Marie wished to study in Paris, but delayed her studies to aid her sister. Marie and Bronisława made an agreement that Marie would provide financial assistance during Bronisława's medical studies in Paris, in exchange for similar assistance two years later. In connection with this, Maria took a position first as a home tutor in Warsaw, then for two years as a governess in Szczuki with a landed family, the Żorawskis, who were relatives of her father, all while continuing to study in her free time While working for the latter family, she fell in love with their son, Kazimierz Żorawski, a future eminent mathematician. His parents rejected the idea of his marrying the penniless relative, and Kazimierz was unable to oppose them. Maria's loss of the relationship with Żorawski was tragic for both. He soon earned a doctorate and pursued an academic career as a mathematician, becoming a professor and rector of Kraków University. Still, as an old man and a mathematics professor at the Warsaw Polytechnic, he would sit contemplatively before the statue of Maria Skłodowska that had been erected in 1935 before the Radium Institute, which she had founded in 1932.

At the beginning of 1890, Bronisława invited Maria to join them in Paris. Maria declined because she could not afford the university tuition; it would take her a year and a half longer to gather the necessary funds. She was helped by her father, who was able to secure a more lucrative position again. She continued to educate herself, reading books, exchanging letters, and being tutored herself. In early 1889 she returned home to her father in Warsaw. She continued working as a governess and remained there until late 1891. She worked as a tutor, studied at the Flying University, and began her practical scientific training (1890–1891) in a chemistry laboratory at the Museum of Industry and Agriculture at Krakowskie Przedmieście 66, near Warsaw's Old Town. The laboratory was run by her cousin Józef Boguski, who had been an assistant in Saint Petersburg to the Russian chemist Dmitri Mendeleyev.

=== Life in Paris ===
In late 1891, she left Poland for France. In Paris, Maria (or Marie, as she would be known in France) briefly found shelter with her sister and brother-in-law before renting a garret closer to the university, in the Latin Quarter, and proceeding with her studies of physics, chemistry, and mathematics at the University of Paris, where she enrolled in late 1891. She subsisted on her meagre resources, keeping herself warm during cold winters by wearing all the clothes she had. She focused so hard on her studies that she sometimes forgot to eat. Skłodowska studied during the day and tutored evenings, barely earning her keep. In 1893, she was awarded a degree in physics and began work in an industrial laboratory of Gabriel Lippmann. Meanwhile, she continued studying at the University of Paris and with the aid of a fellowship she was able to earn a second degree in 1894. (Note: Sources vary concerning the field of her second degree. Tadeusz Estreicher, in the 1938 Polish Biographical Dictionary entry, writes that, while many sources state she earned a degree in mathematics, this is incorrect, and that her second degree was in chemistry.)

Skłodowska had begun her scientific career in Paris with an investigation of the magnetic properties of various steels, commissioned by the Society for the Encouragement of National Industry. That same year, Pierre Curie entered her life: it was their mutual interest in natural sciences that drew them together. Pierre Curie was an instructor at The City of Paris Industrial Physics and Chemistry Higher Educational Institution (ESPCI Paris). They were introduced by Polish physicist Józef Wierusz-Kowalski, who had learned that she was looking for a larger laboratory space, something that Wierusz-Kowalski thought Pierre could access. Though Curie did not have a large laboratory, he was able to find some space for Skłodowska where she was able to begin work.

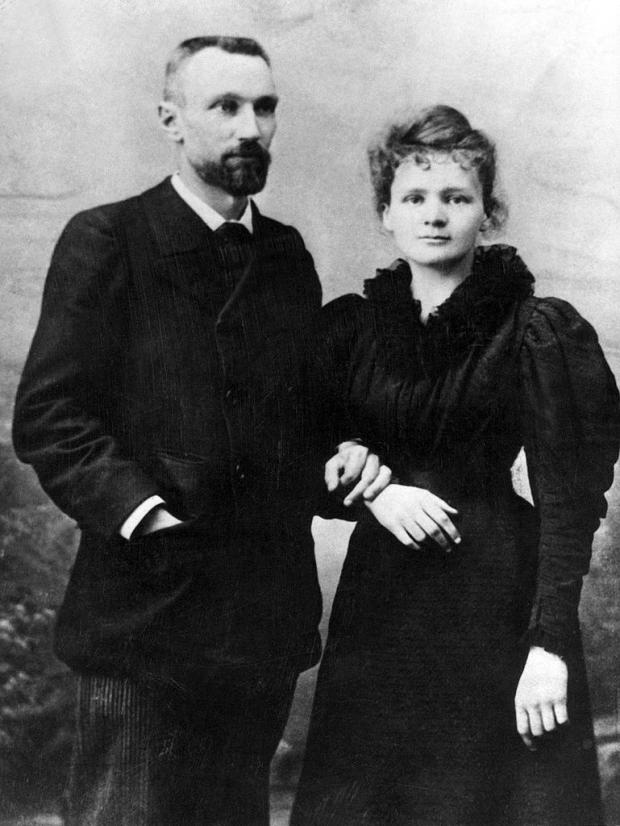
Pierre Curie and Marie Skłodowska-Curie, 1895

Their mutual passion for science brought them increasingly closer, and they began to develop feelings for one another. Eventually, Pierre proposed marriage, but at first Skłodowska did not accept as she was still planning to go back to her native country. Curie, however, declared that he was ready to move with her to Poland, even if it meant being reduced to teaching French. Meanwhile, for the 1894 summer break, Skłodowska returned to Warsaw, where she visited her family. She was still labouring under the illusion that she would be able to work in her chosen field in Poland, but she was denied a place at Kraków University because of sexism in academia. A letter from Pierre convinced her to return to Paris to pursue a PhD. At Skłodowska's insistence, Curie had written up his research on magnetism and received his own doctorate in March 1895; he was also promoted to professor at the School. A contemporary quip would call Skłodowska "Pierre's biggest discovery".

On 26 July 1895, they were married in the Hôtel de Ville in Sceaux; neither wanted a religious service. Marie's dark blue outfit, worn instead of a bridal gown, would serve her for many years as a laboratory outfit. They shared two pastimes: long bicycle trips and journeys abroad, which brought them even closer. In Pierre, Marie had found a new love, a partner, and a scientific collaborator on whom she could depend.

=== New elements ===
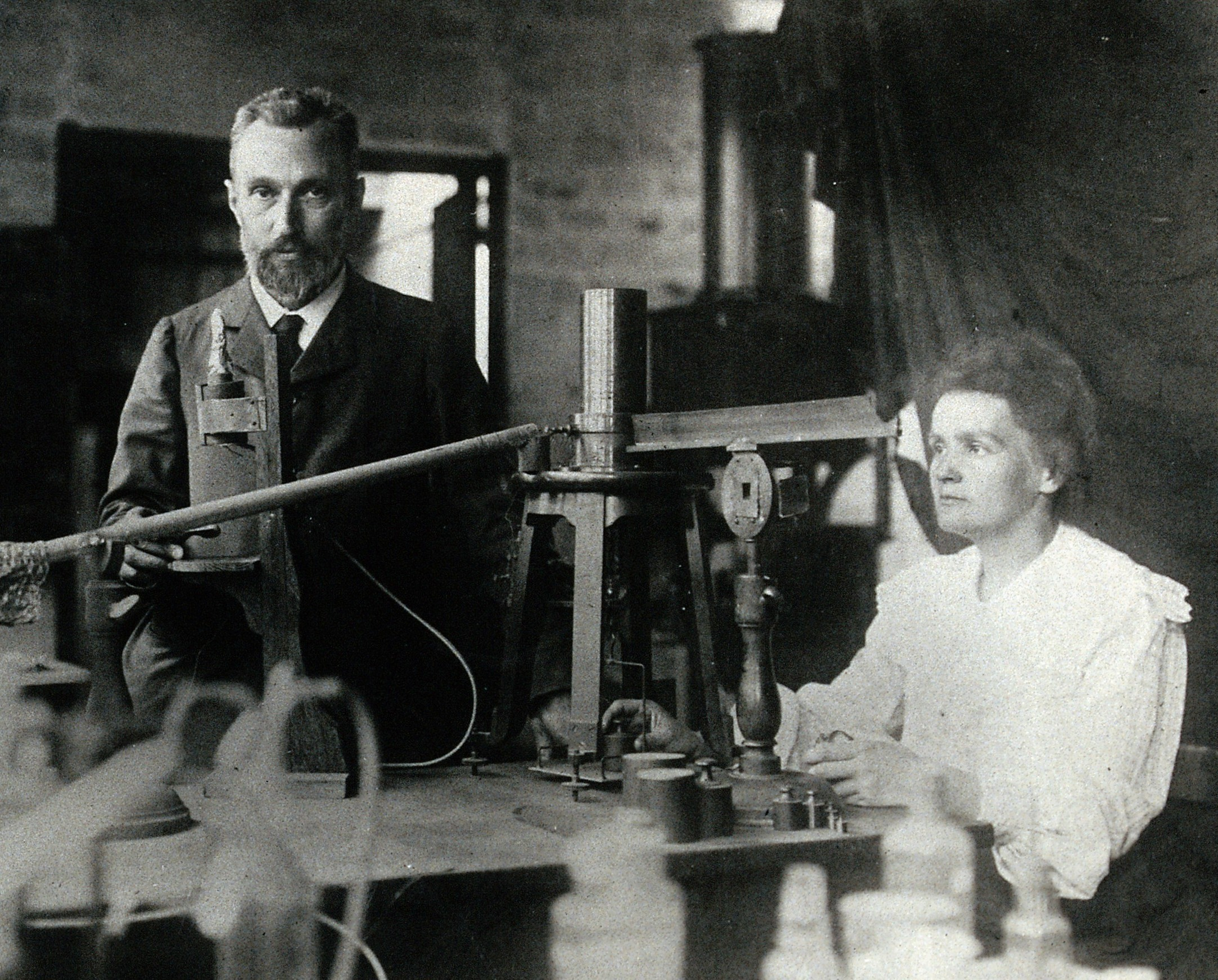
Pierre and Marie Curie in the laboratory, c. 1904

In 1895, Wilhelm Röntgen discovered the existence of X-rays, though the mechanism behind their production was not yet understood. In 1896, Henri Becquerel discovered that uranium salts emitted rays that resembled X-rays in their penetrating power. He demonstrated that this radiation, unlike phosphorescence, did not depend on an external source of energy but seemed to arise spontaneously from uranium itself. Influenced by these two important discoveries, Curie decided to look into uranium rays as a possible field of research for a thesis.

She used an innovative technique to investigate samples. Fifteen years earlier, her husband and his brother had developed a version of the electrometer, a sensitive device for measuring electric charge. Using her husband's electrometer, she discovered that uranium rays caused the air around a sample to conduct electricity. Using this technique, her first result was the finding that the activity of the uranium compounds depended only on the quantity of uranium present. She hypothesized that the radiation was not the outcome of some interaction of molecules but must come from the atom itself. This hypothesis was an important step in disproving the assumption that atoms were indivisible.

In 1897, her daughter Irène was born. To support her family, Curie began teaching at the École normale supérieure. The Curies did not have a dedicated laboratory; most of their research was carried out in a converted shed next to ESPCI. The shed, formerly a medical school dissecting room, was poorly ventilated and not even waterproof. They were unaware of the deleterious effects of radiation exposure attendant on their continued unprotected work with radioactive substances. ESPCI did not sponsor her research, but she received subsidies from metallurgical and mining companies and from various organisations and governments.

Curie's systematic studies included two uranium minerals, pitchblende and torbernite (also known as chalcolite). Her electrometer showed that pitchblende was four times as active as uranium itself, and chalcolite twice as active. She concluded that, if her earlier results relating the quantity of uranium to its activity were correct, then these two minerals must contain small quantities of another substance that was far more active than uranium. She began a systematic search for additional substances that emit radiation, and by 1898 she discovered that the element thorium was also radioactive. Pierre Curie was increasingly intrigued by her work. By mid-1898 he was so invested in it that he decided to drop his work on crystals and to join her.

The [research] idea [writes Reid] was her own; no one helped her formulate it, and although she took it to her husband for his opinion she clearly established her ownership of it. She later recorded the fact twice in her biography of her husband to ensure there was no chance whatever of any ambiguity. It [is] likely that already at this early stage of her career [she] realized that... many scientists would find it difficult to believe that a woman could be capable of the original work in which she was involved.

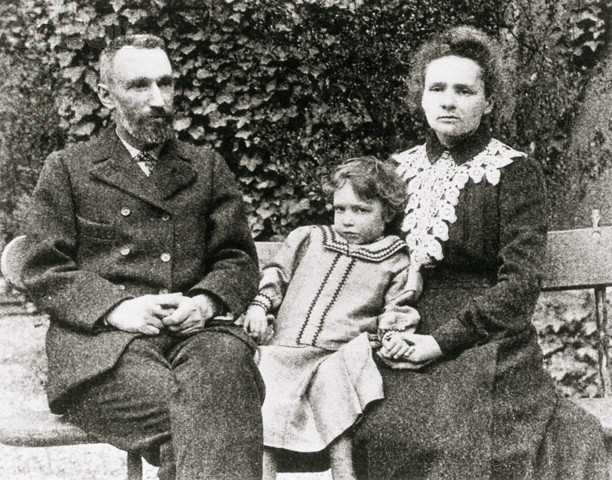
Pierre, Irène, and Marie Curie, c. 1902

She was acutely aware of the importance of promptly publishing her discoveries and thus establishing her priority. Curie chose to present her work to the Académie des Sciences, the same rapid means of publication that Becquerel had used two years earlier. Since she was not a member of the Académie, her paper, giving a brief and simple account of her work, was presented for her to the Académie on 12 April 1898 by her former professor, Gabriel Lippmann. However, while Becquerel had presented his discovery the day after he made it and got credit for the discovery of radioactivity before Silvanus Thompson, Curie was beaten by Gerhard Carl Schmidt in the race to report that thorium gives off rays in the same way as uranium.

At that time, no one else in the world of physics had noticed what Curie recorded in a sentence of her paper, describing how much greater were the activities of pitchblende and chalcolite than that of uranium itself: "The fact is very remarkable, and leads to the belief that these minerals may contain an element which is much more active than uranium." She later would recall how she felt "a passionate desire to verify this hypothesis as rapidly as possible". On 14 April 1898, the Curies optimistically weighed out a 100-gram sample of pitchblende and ground it with a pestle and mortar. They did not realise at the time that what they were searching for was present in such minute quantities that they would eventually have to process tonnes of the ore.

In July 1898, Curie and her husband published a joint paper announcing the existence of an element they named 'polonium', in honour of her native Poland, which would for another twenty years remain partitioned among three empires (Russia, Austria, and Prussia). On 26 December 1898, the Curies announced the existence of a second element, which they named 'radium', from the Latin word for 'ray'. In the course of their research, they also coined the word 'radioactivity'.

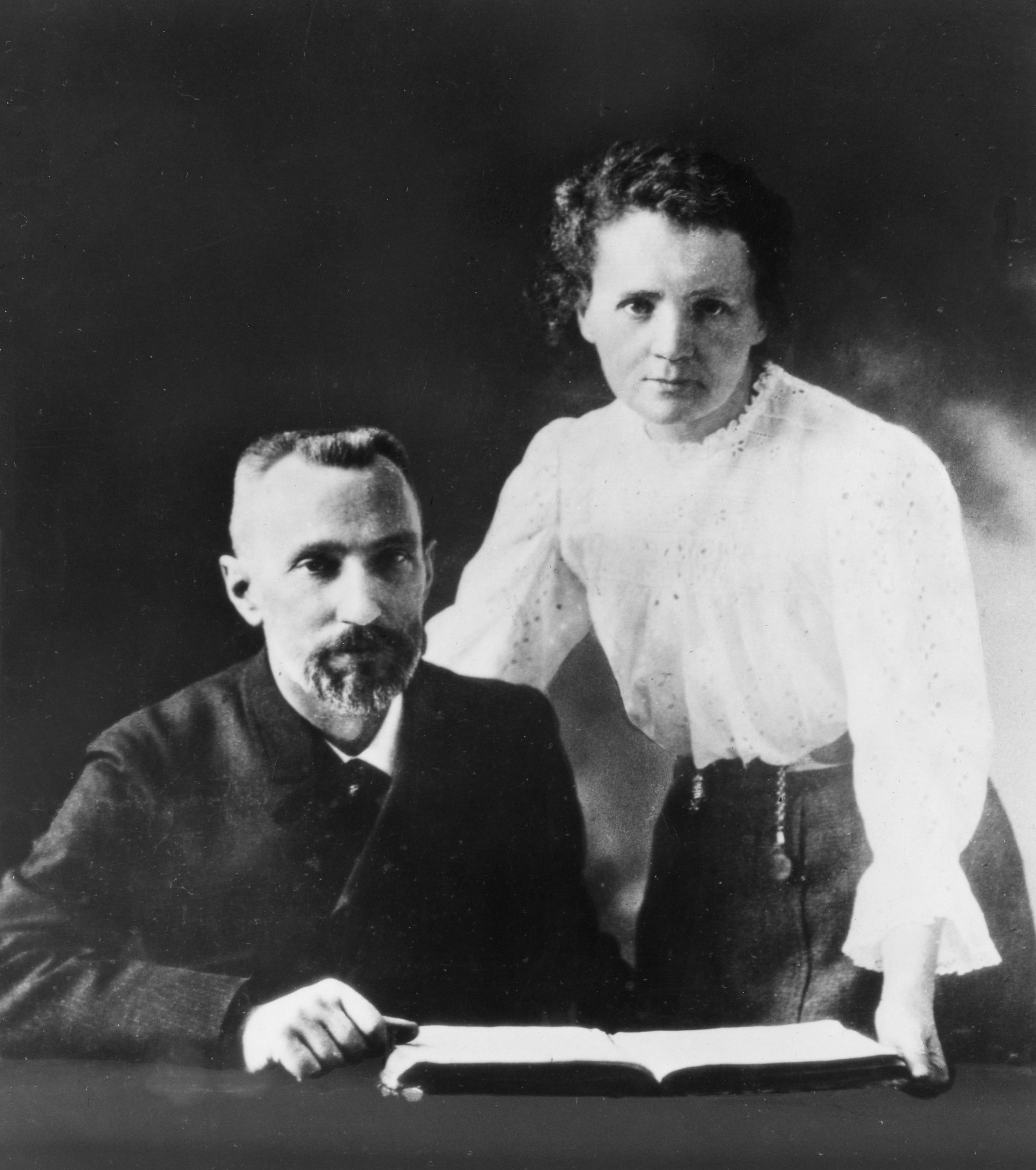
Pierre and Marie Curie, c. 1903

To prove their discoveries beyond any doubt, the Curies sought to isolate polonium and radium in pure form. Pitchblende is a complex mineral; the chemical separation of its constituents was an arduous task. The discovery of polonium had been relatively easy; chemically it resembles the element bismuth, and polonium was the only bismuth-like substance in the ore. Radium, however, was more elusive; it is closely related chemically to barium, and pitchblende contains both elements. By 1898 the Curies had obtained traces of radium, but appreciable quantities, uncontaminated with barium, were still beyond reach. The Curies undertook the arduous task of separating out radium salt by differential crystallisation. From a tonne of pitchblende, one-tenth of a gram of radium chloride was separated in 1902. In 1910, she isolated pure radium metal. She never succeeded in isolating polonium, which has a half-life of only 138 days.

Between 1898 and 1902, the Curies published, jointly or separately, a total of 32 scientific papers, including one that announced that, when exposed to radium, diseased, tumour-forming cells were destroyed faster than healthy cells.

In 1900, Curie became the first woman faculty member at the École normale supérieure de jeunes filles and her husband joined the faculty of the University of Paris. In 1902 she visited Poland on the occasion of her father's death.

In June 1903, supervised by Gabriel Lippmann, Curie was awarded her doctorate from the University of Paris. Earlier that month the couple were invited to the Royal Institution in London to give a Friday Evening Discourse on Radium. At the time, Marie was four months pregnant, and suffering from extreme fatigue. Discourses were given by an individual, and though no rule existed barring women from speaking, convention and circumstance meant that Pierre Curie gave the address.

Pierre's lecture, entirely in French, clearly indicated Marie's contributions to their research. The Royal Institution did however, break with tradition; Lady Dewar honoured Marie by presenting her with a bouquet of La France Rosa, and Marie carried them into the theatre, where she sat on the front row alongside the most esteemed members of the Royal Institution. Meanwhile, a new industry began developing, based on radium. The Curies did not patent their discovery and benefited little from this increasingly profitable business.

=== Nobel Prizes ===
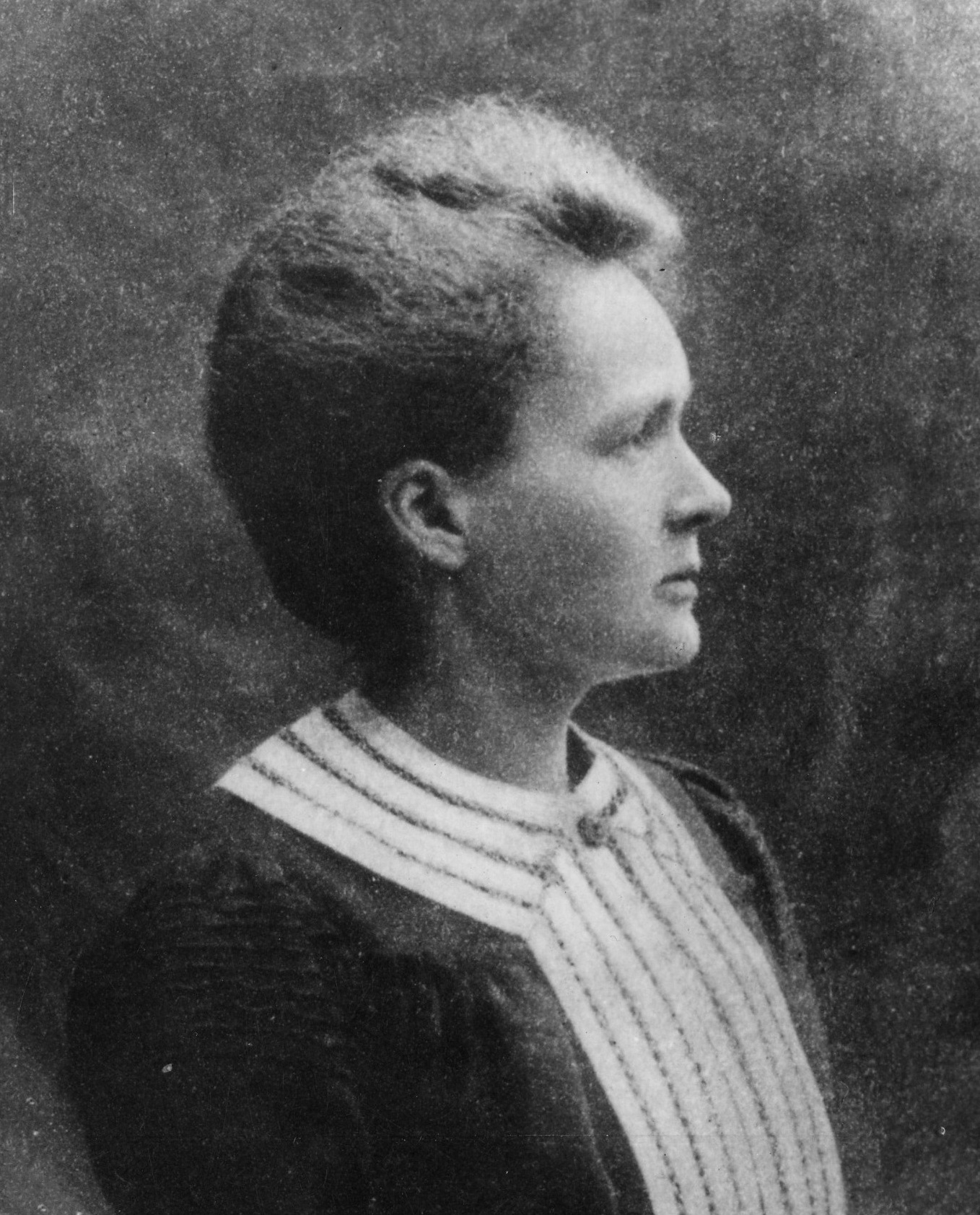
1903 Nobel Prize portrait

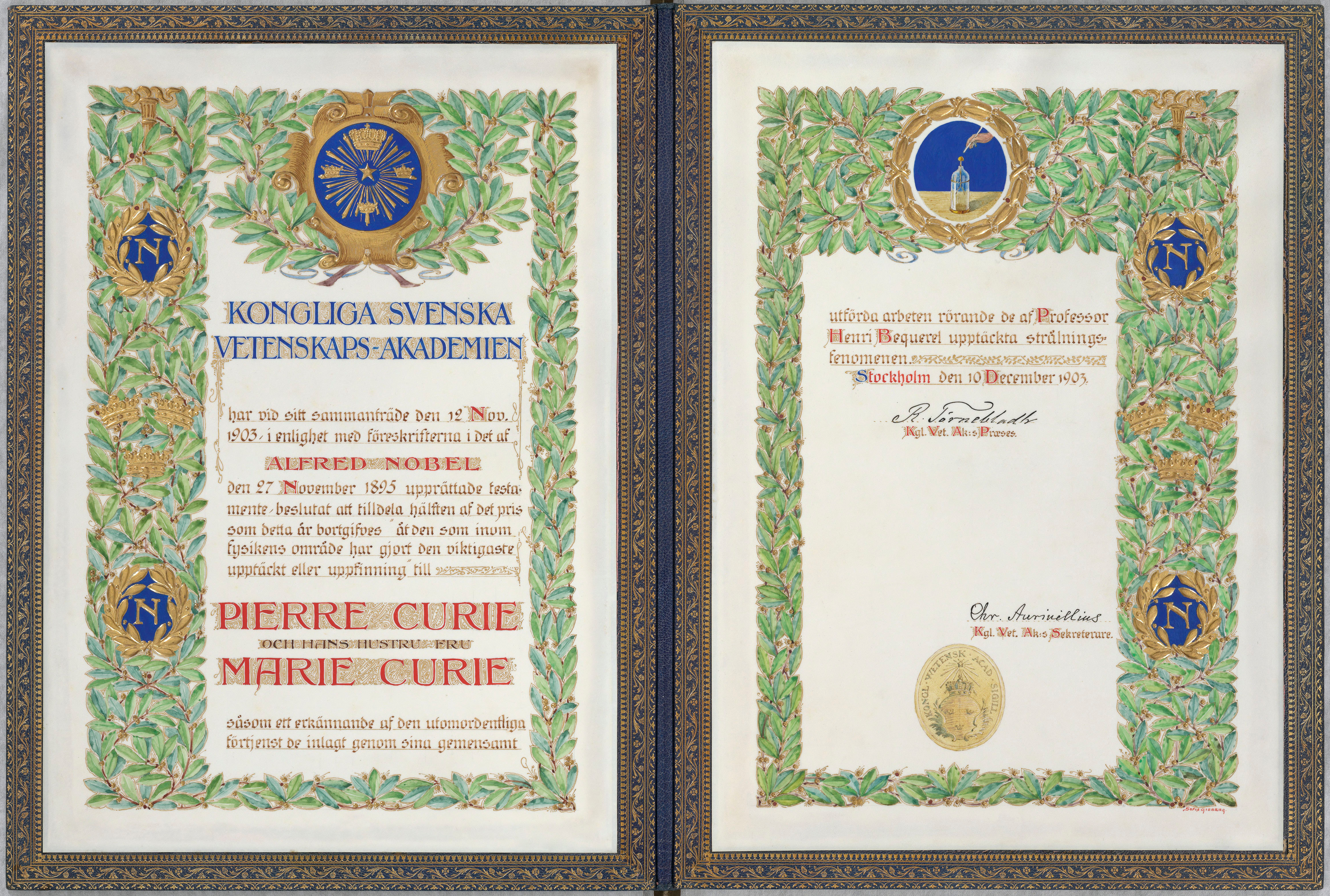
1903 Nobel Prize diploma

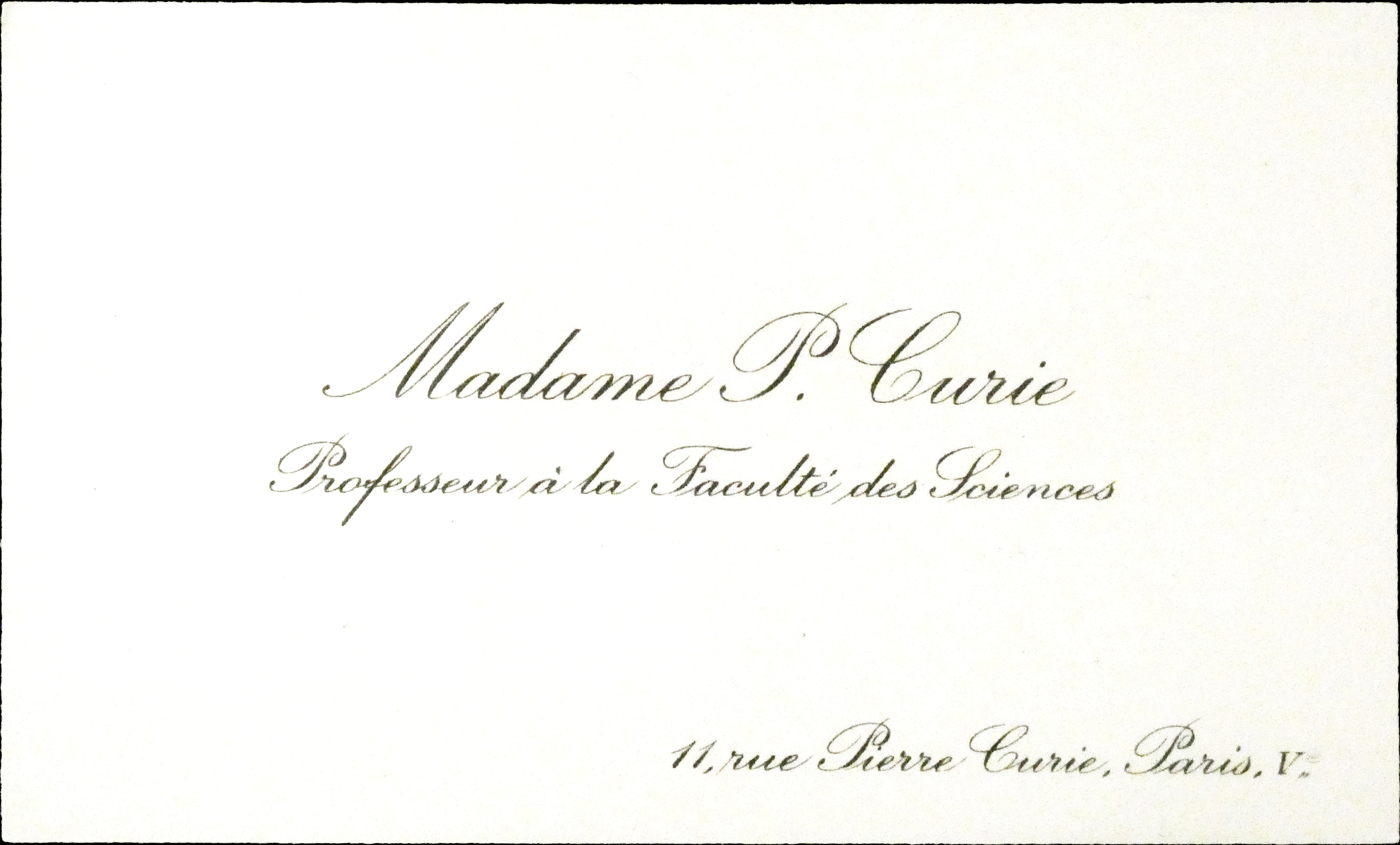
Marie Curie's business card as professor at the Faculty of Sciences

In December 1903 the Royal Swedish Academy of Sciences awarded Pierre Curie, Marie Curie, and Henri Becquerel the Nobel Prize in Physics, "in recognition of the extraordinary services they have rendered by their joint researches on the radiation phenomena discovered by Professor Henri Becquerel." At first the committee had intended to honour only Pierre Curie and Henri Becquerel, but a committee member and advocate for women scientists, Swedish mathematician Magnus Gösta Mittag-Leffler, alerted Pierre to the situation, and after his complaint, Marie's name was added to the nomination. Marie Curie was the first woman to be awarded a Nobel Prize.

Curie and her husband declined to go to Stockholm to receive the prize in person; they were too busy with their work, and Pierre Curie, who disliked public ceremonies, was feeling increasingly ill. As Nobel laureates were required to deliver a lecture, the Curies finally undertook the trip in 1905. The award money allowed the Curies to hire their first laboratory assistant. Following the award of the Nobel Prize, and galvanised by an offer from the University of Geneva, which offered Pierre Curie a position, the University of Paris gave him a professorship and the chair of physics, although the Curies still did not have a proper laboratory. Upon Pierre Curie's complaint, the University of Paris relented and agreed to furnish a new laboratory, but it would not be ready until 1906.

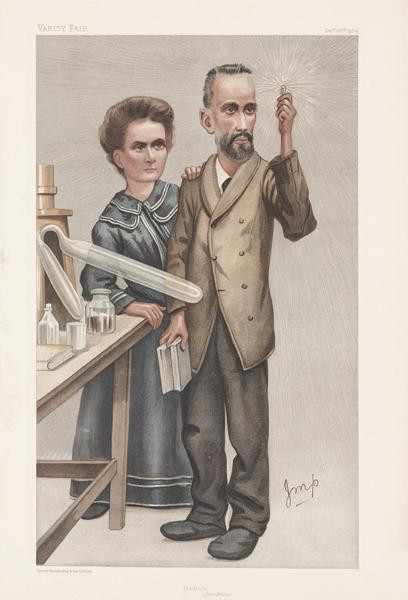
Caricature of Marie and Pierre Curie, captioned "Radium", in the London magazine Vanity Fair, December 1904

In December 1904, Curie gave birth to their second daughter, Ève. She hired Polish governesses to teach her daughters her native language, and sent or took them on visits to Poland.

On 19 April 1906, Pierre Curie died in a road accident. Walking across the Rue Dauphine in heavy rain, he was struck by a horse-drawn vehicle and fell under its wheels, which fractured his skull and killed him instantly. Curie was devastated by her husband's death. On 13 May 1906 the physics department of the University of Paris decided to retain the chair that had been created for her late husband and offer it to Marie. She accepted it, hoping to create a world-class laboratory as a tribute to her husband Pierre. She was the first woman to become a professor at the University of Paris.

Curie's quest to create a new laboratory did not end with the University of Paris, however. In her later years, she headed the Radium Institute (Institut du radium, now Curie Institute, Institut Curie), a radioactivity laboratory created for her by the Pasteur Institute and the University of Paris. The initiative for creating the Radium Institute had come in 1909 from Pierre Paul Émile Roux, director of the Pasteur Institute, who had been disappointed that the University of Paris was not giving Curie a proper laboratory and had suggested that she move to the Pasteur Institute. Only then, with the threat of Curie leaving, did the University of Paris relent, and eventually the Curie Pavilion became a joint initiative of the University of Paris and the Pasteur Institute.

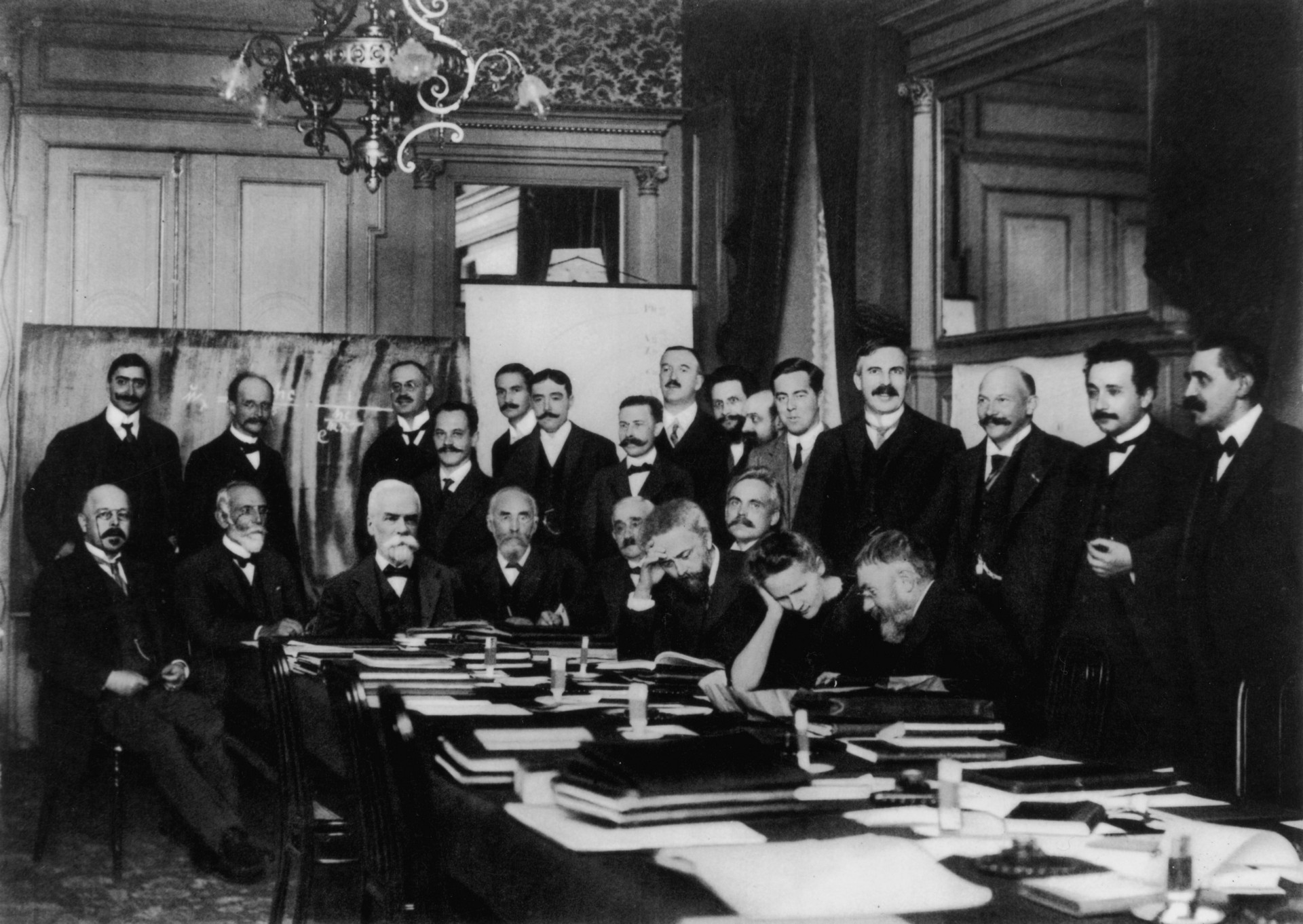
At the first Solvay Conference (1911), Curie (seated second from right) confers with Henri Poincaré. Standing nearby are Rutherford (fourth from right), Einstein (second from right), and Paul Langevin (far right).

In 1910 Curie succeeded in isolating radium; she also defined an international standard for radioactive emissions that was eventually named for her and Pierre: the curie. Nevertheless, in 1911 the French Academy of Sciences failed, by one or two votes, to elect her to membership in the academy. Elected instead was Édouard Branly, an inventor who had helped Guglielmo Marconi develop the wireless telegraph. It was only over half a century later, in 1962, that a doctoral student of Curie's, Marguerite Perey, became the first woman elected to membership in the academy.

Despite Curie's fame as a scientist working for France, the public's attitude tended toward xenophobia—the same that had led to the Dreyfus affair—which also fuelled false speculation that Curie was Jewish. During the French Academy of Sciences elections, she was vilified by the right-wing press as a foreigner and atheist. Her daughter later remarked on the French press's hypocrisy in portraying Curie as an unworthy foreigner when she was nominated for a French honour, but portraying her as a French heroine when she received foreign honours such as her Nobel Prizes.

In 1911, it was revealed that Curie was involved in a year-long affair with physicist Paul Langevin, a former student of Pierre Curie's, a married man who was estranged from his wife. This resulted in a press scandal that was exploited by her academic opponents. Curie (then in her mid-40s) was five years older than Langevin and was misrepresented in the tabloids as a foreign Jewish home-wrecker. When the scandal broke, she was away at a conference in Belgium; on her return, she found an angry mob in front of her house and had to seek refuge, with her daughters, in the home of her friend Camille Marbo.

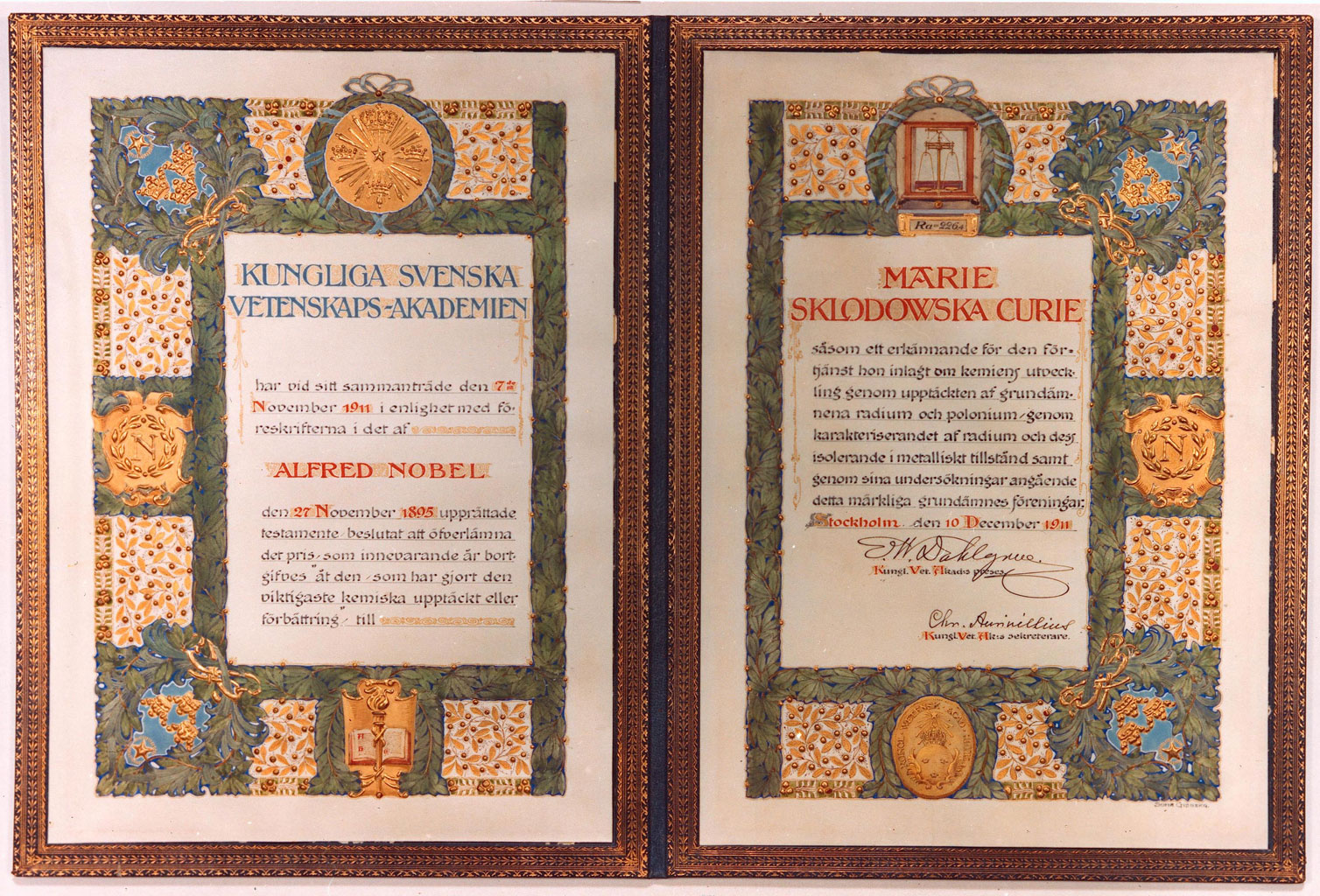
1911 Nobel Prize diploma

International recognition for her work had been growing to new heights, and the Royal Swedish Academy of Sciences, overcoming opposition prompted by the Langevin scandal, honoured her a second time, with the 1911 Nobel Prize in Chemistry. This award was "in recognition of her services to the advancement of chemistry by the discovery of the elements radium and polonium, by the isolation of radium and the study of the nature and compounds of this remarkable element". Because of the negative publicity due to her affair with Langevin, the chair of the Nobel committee, Svante Arrhenius, attempted to prevent her attendance at the official ceremony for her Nobel Prize in Chemistry, citing her questionable moral standing. Curie replied that she would be present at the ceremony, because "the prize has been given to her for her discovery of polonium and radium" and that "there is no relation between her scientific work and the facts of her private life".

She was the first person to win or share two Nobel Prizes, and remains alone with Linus Pauling as Nobel laureates in two fields each. A delegation of celebrated Polish men of learning, headed by novelist Henryk Sienkiewicz, encouraged her to return to Poland and continue her research in her native country. Curie's second Nobel Prize enabled her to persuade the French government to support the Radium Institute, built in 1914, where research was conducted in chemistry, physics, and medicine. A month after accepting her 1911 Nobel Prize, she was hospitalised with depression and a kidney ailment. For most of 1912, she avoided public life but did spend time in England with her friend and fellow physicist Hertha Ayrton. She returned to her laboratory only in December, after a break of about 14 months.

In 1912 the Warsaw Scientific Society offered her the directorship of a new laboratory in Warsaw but she declined, focusing on the developing Radium Institute to be completed in August 1914, and on a new street named Rue Pierre-Curie (today rue Pierre-et-Marie-Curie). She was appointed director of the Curie Laboratory in the Radium Institute of the University of Paris, founded in 1914. She visited Poland in 1913 and was welcomed in Warsaw but the visit was mostly ignored by the Russian authorities. The institute's development was interrupted by the First World War, as most researchers were drafted into the French Army; it fully resumed its activities after the war, in 1919.

=== World War I ===
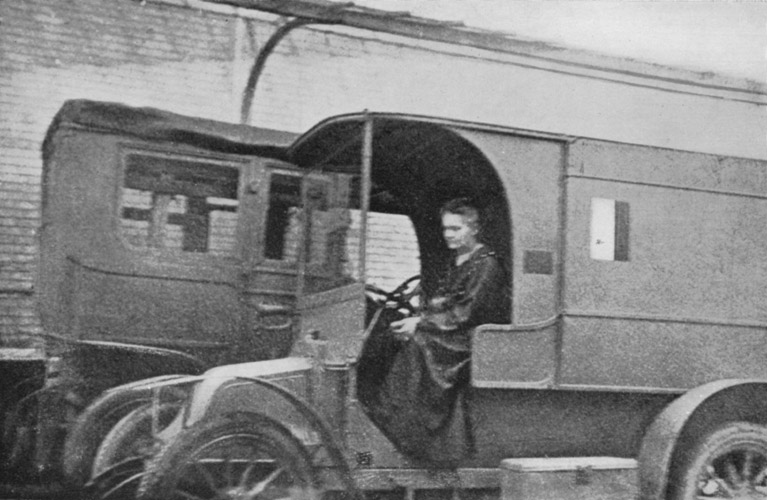
Curie in a mobile X-ray vehicle, c. 1915

During World War I, Curie recognised that wounded soldiers were best served if operated upon as soon as possible. She saw a need for field radiological centres near the front lines to assist battlefield surgeons, including to obviate amputations when in fact limbs could be saved. After a quick study of radiology, anatomy, and automotive mechanics, she procured X-ray equipment, vehicles, and auxiliary generators, and she developed mobile radiography units, which came to be popularly known as petites Curies ("Little Curies"). She became the director of the Red Cross Radiology Service and set up France's first military radiology centre, operational by late 1914. Assisted at first by a military doctor and her 17-year-old daughter Irène, Curie directed the installation of 20 mobile radiological vehicles and another 200 radiological units at field hospitals in the first year of the war. Later, she began training other women as aides.

In 1915, Curie produced hollow needles containing "radium emanation", a colourless, radioactive gas given off by radium, later identified as radon, to be used for sterilising infected tissue. She provided the radium from her own one-gram supply. It is estimated that over a million wounded soldiers were treated with her X-ray units. Busy with this work, she carried out very little scientific research during that period. In spite of all her humanitarian contributions to the French war effort, Curie never received any formal recognition of it from the French government.

Also, promptly after the war started, she attempted to donate her gold Nobel Prize medals to the war effort but the French National Bank refused to accept them. She did buy war bonds, using her Nobel Prize money. She said:

I am going to give up the little gold I possess. I shall add to this the scientific medals, which are quite useless to me. There is something else: by sheer laziness I had allowed the money for my second Nobel Prize to remain in Stockholm in Swedish crowns. This is the chief part of what we possess. I should like to bring it back here and invest it in war loans. The state needs it. Only, I have no illusions: this money will probably be lost.

She was also an active member in committees of Poles in France dedicated to the Polish cause. After the war, she summarised her wartime experiences in a book, Radiology in War (1919).

=== Postwar years ===
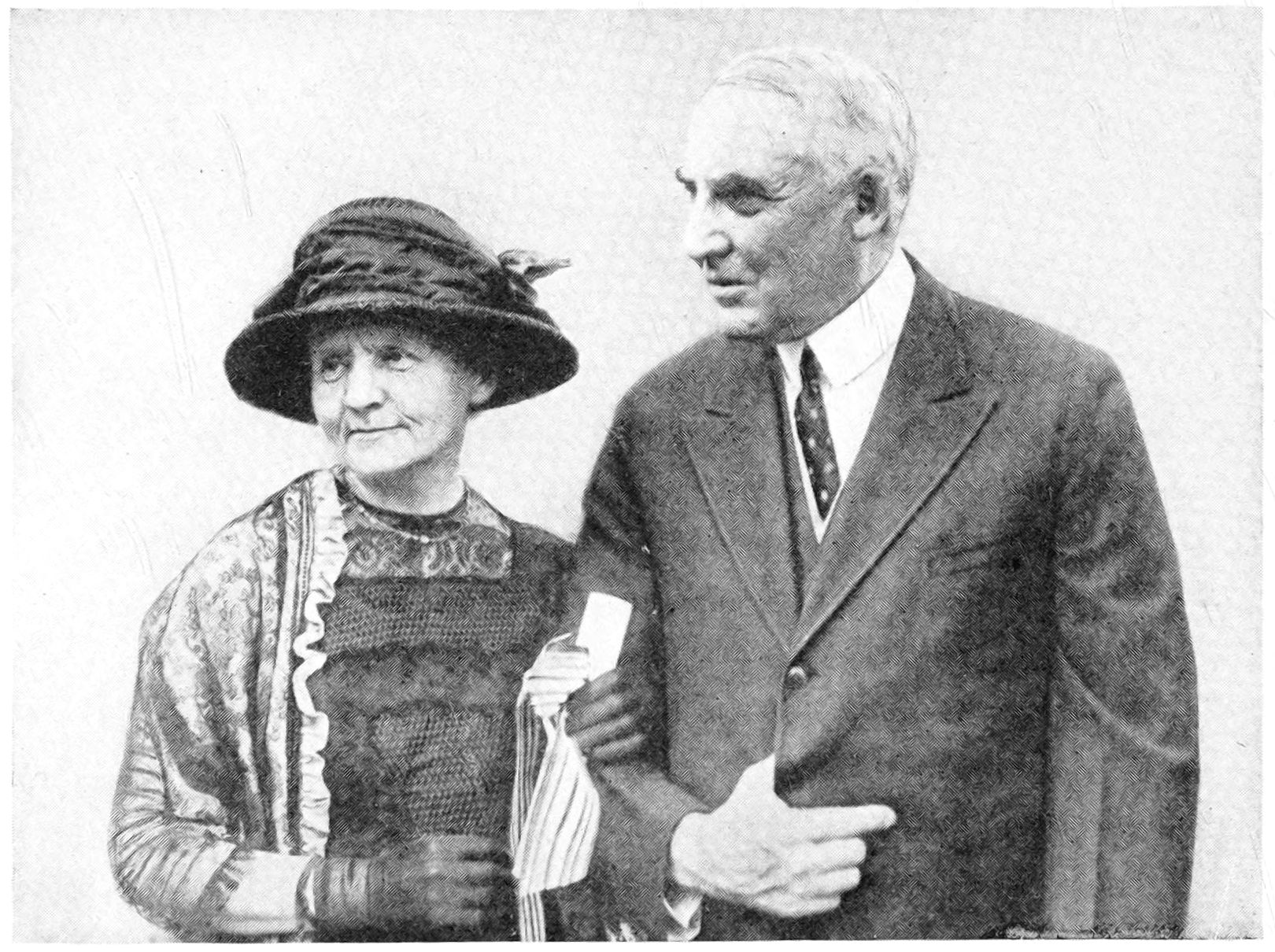
Marie Curie and President Harding at the White House, May 20, 1921.

In 1920, for the 25th anniversary of the discovery of radium, the French government established a stipend for her; the previous recipient of such a stipend had been Louis Pasteur, in 1874. In 1921, Curie toured the United States to raise funds for research on radium. Marie Mattingly Meloney, after interviewing Curie, created a Marie Curie Radium Fund and helped publicise her trip. (Note: Marie Skłodowska Curie was escorted to the United States by the American author and social activist Charlotte Kellogg.)

In 1921 U.S. President Warren G. Harding received Curie at the White House to present her with the 1 gram of radium collected in the United States. Before the meeting, recognising her growing fame abroad, and embarrassed by the fact that she had no French official distinctions to wear in public, the French government had offered her a Legion of Honour award, but she refused it. In 1922 she became a fellow of the French Academy of Medicine. She also travelled to other countries, appearing publicly and giving lectures in Belgium, Brazil, Spain, and Czechoslovakia.

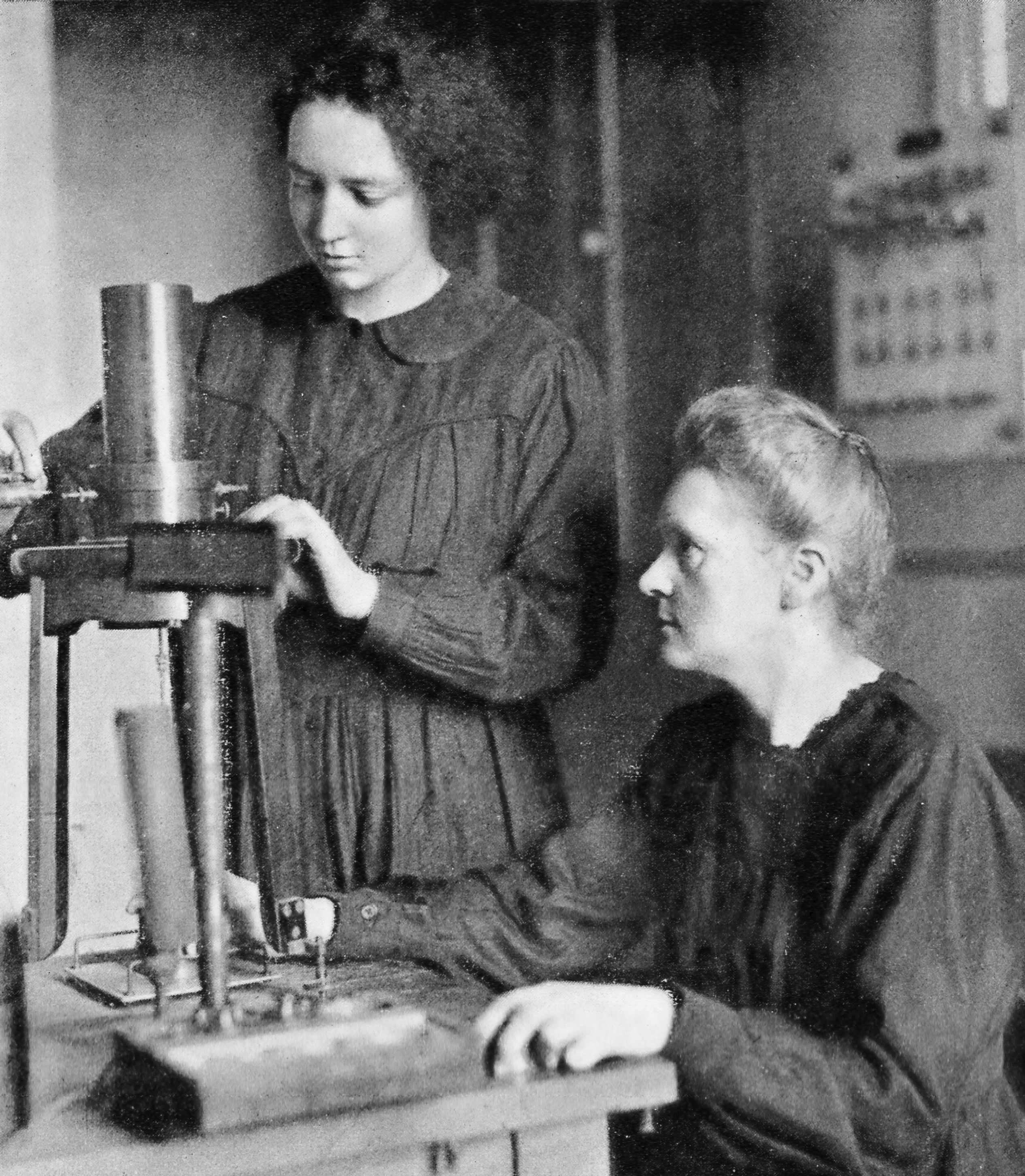
Marie and daughter Irène, 1925

Led by Curie, the Institute produced four more Nobel Prize winners, including her daughter Irène Joliot-Curie and her son-in-law, Frédéric Joliot-Curie. Eventually, it became one of the world's four major radioactivity-research laboratories, the others being the Cavendish Laboratory, with Ernest Rutherford; the Institute for Radium Research, Vienna, with Stefan Meyer; and the Kaiser Wilhelm Institute for Chemistry, with Otto Hahn and Lise Meitner.

In August 1922, Curie became a member of the League of Nations' newly created International Committee on Intellectual Cooperation. She sat on the committee until 1934 and contributed to League of Nations' scientific coordination with other prominent researchers such as Albert Einstein, Hendrik Lorentz, and Henri Bergson. In 1923 she wrote a biography of her late husband, titled Pierre Curie. In 1925 she visited Poland to participate in a ceremony laying the foundations for Warsaw's Radium Institute. Her second American tour, in 1929, succeeded in equipping the Warsaw Radium Institute with radium; the Institute opened in 1932, with her sister Bronisława its director. These distractions from her scientific labours, and the attendant publicity, caused her much discomfort but provided resources for her work. In 1930, she was elected to the International Atomic Weights Committee, on which she served until her death. In 1931, Curie was awarded the Cameron Prize for Therapeutics of the University of Edinburgh.

=== Death ===
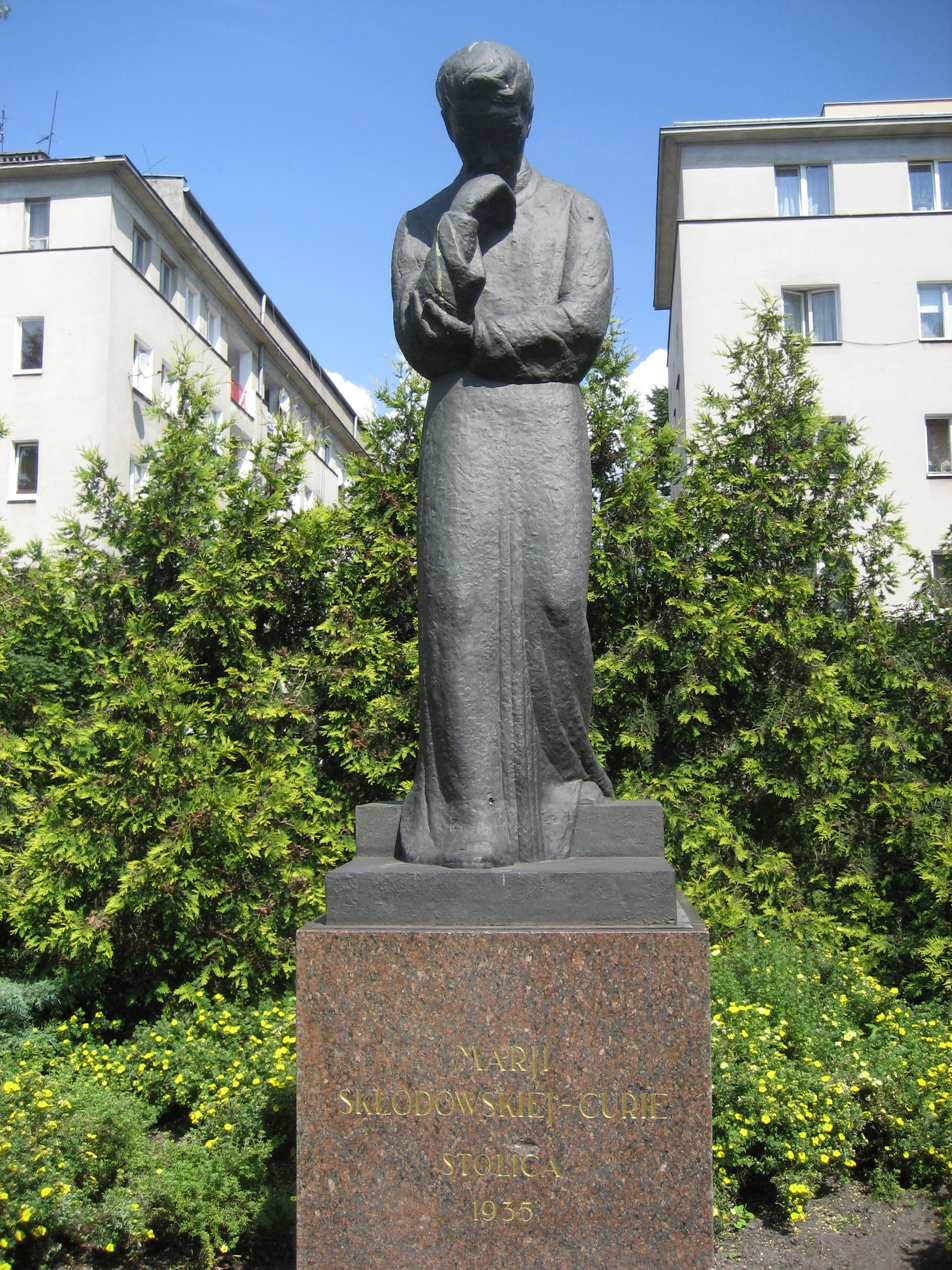
1935 statue, facing the Radium Institute, Warsaw

Curie visited Poland for the last time in early 1934. A few months later, on 4 July 1934, she died aged 66 at the Sancellemoz sanatorium in Passy, Haute-Savoie, from aplastic anaemia believed to have been contracted from her long-term exposure to radiation, causing damage to her bone marrow.

The damaging effects of ionising radiation were not known at the time of her work, which had been carried out without the safety measures later developed. She had carried test tubes containing radioactive isotopes in her pocket, and she stored them in her desk drawer, remarking on the faint light that the substances gave off in the dark. Curie was also exposed to X-rays from unshielded equipment while serving as a radiologist in field hospitals during the First World War. When Curie's body was exhumed in 1995, the French Office de Protection contre les Rayonnements Ionisants (OPRI) "concluded that she could not have been exposed to lethal levels of radium while she was alive". They pointed out that radium poses a risk only if it is ingested, and speculated that her illness was more likely to have been due to her use of radiography during the First World War.

She was interred at the cemetery in Sceaux, alongside her husband Pierre. Sixty years later, in 1995, in honour of their achievements, the remains of both were transferred to the Paris Panthéon. Their remains were sealed in a lead lining because of the radioactivity. Because radium-226 has a half-life of about 1,600 years, her notebooks are expected to remain radioactive for well over a thousand years. She became the second woman to be interred at the Panthéon (after Sophie Berthelot) and the first woman to be honoured with interment in the Panthéon on her own merits.

Because of their levels of radioactive contamination, her papers from the 1890s are considered too dangerous to handle. Even her cookbooks are highly radioactive. Her papers are kept in lead-lined boxes, and those who wish to consult them must wear protective clothing. In her last year, she worked on a book, Radioactivity, which was published posthumously in 1935.

== Legacy ==
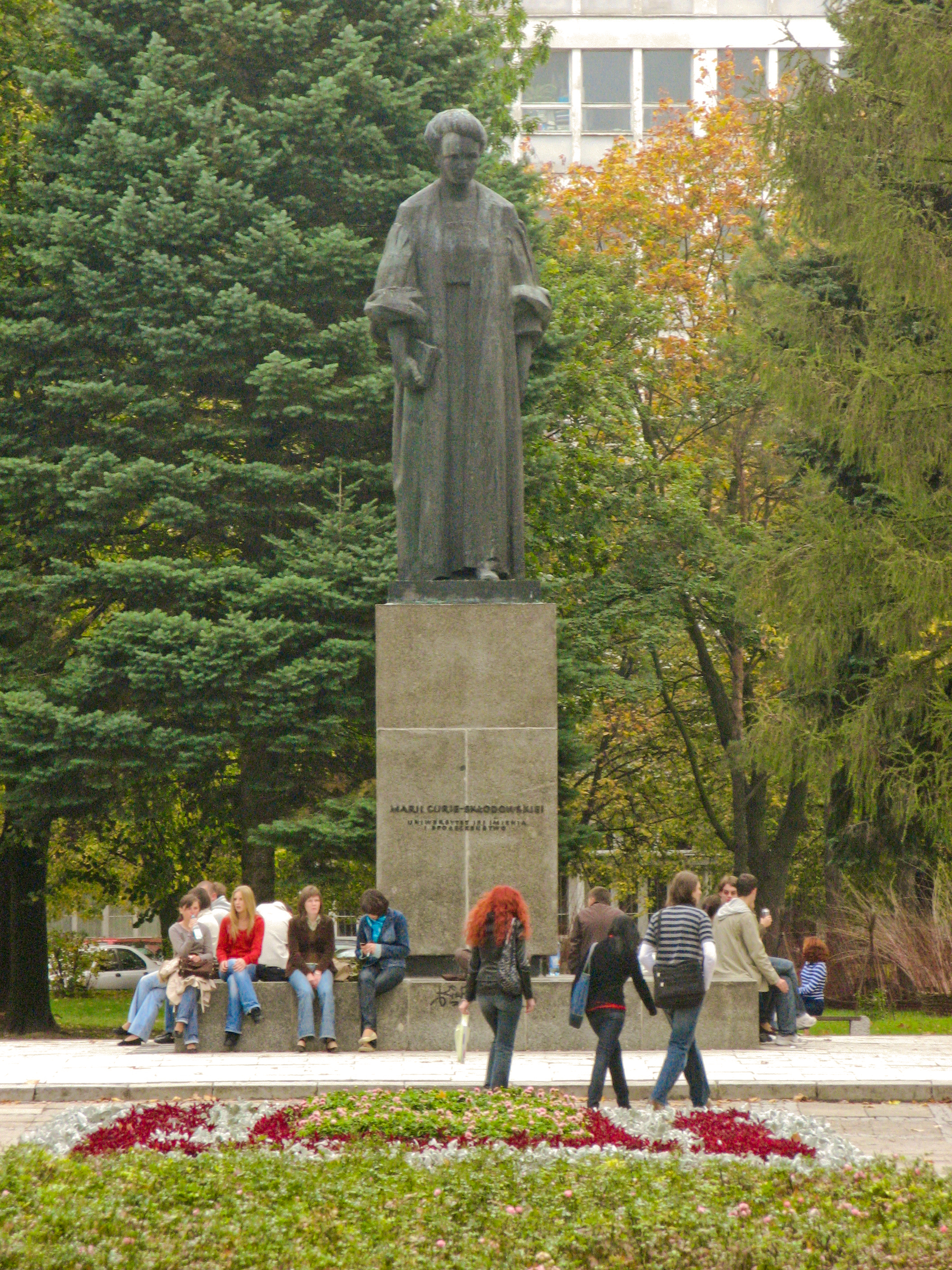
The Statue of Maria Skłodowska-Curie, installed in Lublin, Poland

The physical and societal aspects of the Curies' work contributed to shaping the world of the twentieth and twenty-first centuries. Curie's work laid the foundation for modern nuclear physics, cancer treatments, and radiography. Her techniques for isolating radioactive isotopes are still used in research and medicine. Cornell University professor L. Pearce Williams observes:

The result of the Curies' work was epoch-making. Radium's radioactivity was so great that it could not be ignored. It seemed to contradict the principle of the conservation of energy and therefore forced a reconsideration of the foundations of physics. On the experimental level the discovery of radium provided men like Ernest Rutherford with sources of radioactivity with which they could probe the structure of the atom. As a result of Rutherford's experiments with alpha radiation, the nuclear atom was first postulated. In medicine, the radioactivity of radium appeared to offer a means by which cancer could be successfully attacked.

In addition to helping to overturn established ideas in physics and chemistry, Curie's work has had a profound effect in the societal sphere. To attain her scientific achievements, she had to overcome barriers, in both her native and her adoptive country, that were placed in her way because she was a woman. She also mentored female scientists at the Radium Institute, helping pave the way for women in physics and chemistry.

She was known for her honesty and moderate lifestyle. Having received a small scholarship in 1893, she returned it in 1897 as soon as she began earning her keep. She gave much of her first Nobel Prize money to friends, family, students, and research associates. Curie intentionally refrained from patenting the radium-isolation process so that the scientific community could do research unhindered. (Note: However, Patricia Fara writes: "Marie Skłodowska Curie's reputation as a scientific martyr is often supported by quoting her denial (carefully crafted by her American publicist, Marie Meloney) that she derived any personal gain from her research: 'There were no patents. We were working in the interests of science. Radium was not to enrich anyone. Radium... belongs to all people.' As Eva Hemmungs Wirtén pointed out in Making Marie Curie, this claim takes on a different hue once you learn that, under French law, Curie was banned from taking out a patent in her own name, so that any profits from her research would automatically have gone to her husband, Pierre." Patricia Fara, "It leads to everything" (review of Paul Sen, Einstein's Fridge: The Science of Fire, Ice and the Universe, William Collins, April 2021, ISBN 978 0 00 826279 2, 305 pp.), London Review of Books, vol. 43, no. 18 (23 September 2021), pp. 20–21 (quotation, p. 21).) She insisted that monetary gifts and awards be given to the scientific institutions she was affiliated with rather than to her. She and her husband often refused awards and medals. Albert Einstein reportedly remarked that she was probably the only person who could not be corrupted by fame.

== Commemorations ==
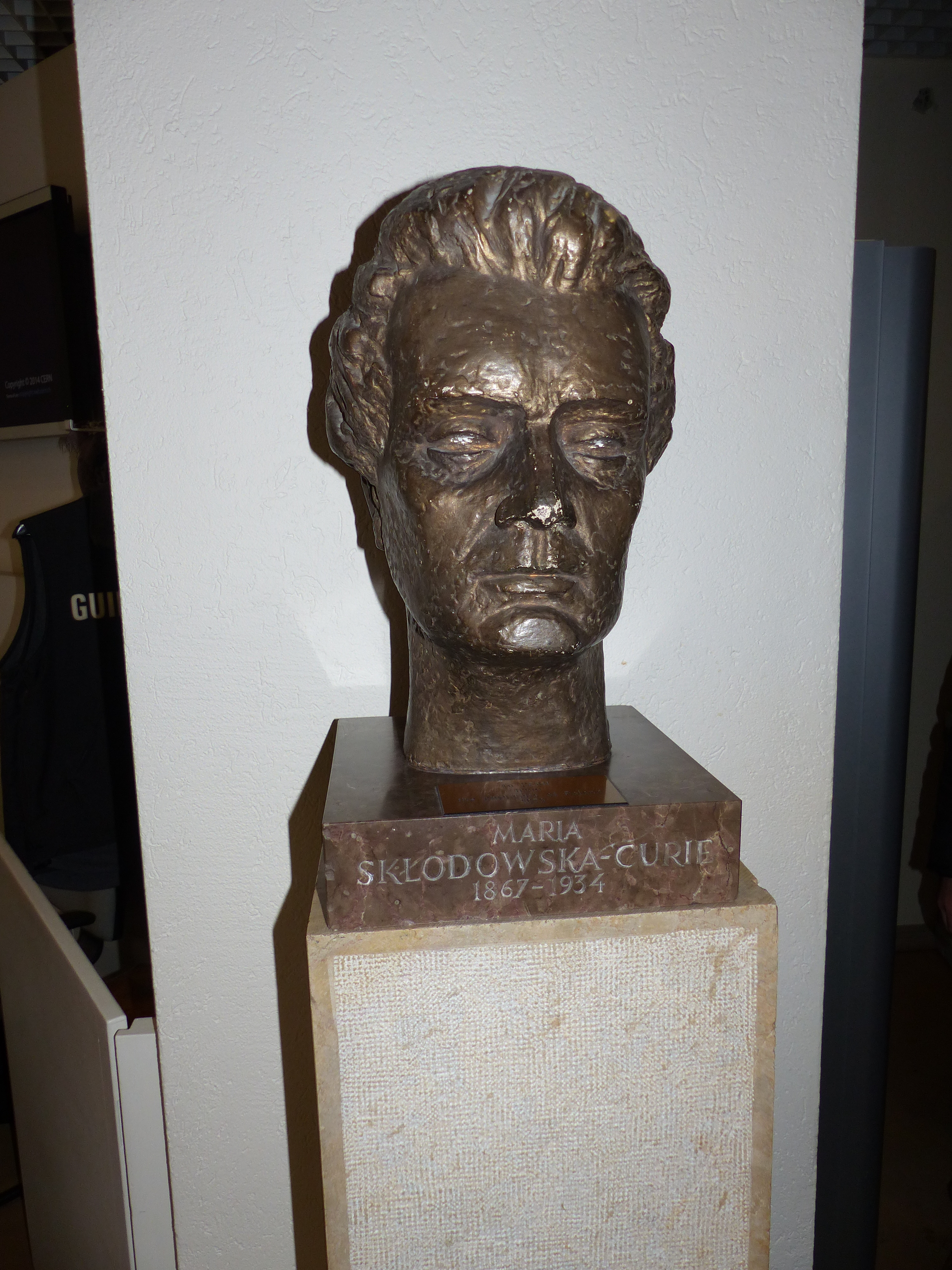
Bust of "Maria Skłodowska-Curie", CERN Museum, Switzerland, 2015

As one of the most famous scientists in history, Marie Curie has become an icon in the scientific world and has received tributes from across the globe, even in the realm of pop culture. She also received many honorary degrees from universities across the world.

Marie Curie was the first woman to win a Nobel Prize, the first person to win two Nobel Prizes, the only woman to win in two fields, and the only person to win in multiple sciences. Awards and honours that she received include:

- Nobel Prize in Physics (1903, with her husband Pierre Curie and Henri Becquerel)
- Davy Medal (1903, with Pierre)
- Matteucci Medal (1904, with Pierre)
- Actonian Prize (1907)
- Elliott Cresson Medal (1909)
- Legion of Honour (1909, rejected)
- Nobel Prize in Chemistry (1911)
- Civil Order of Alfonso XII (1919)
- Franklin Medal of the American Philosophical Society (1921)
- Order of the White Eagle (2018, posthumously)

Entities that have been named after Marie Curie include:

- The curie (symbol Ci), a unit of radioactivity, is named in honour of her and Pierre Curie (although the commission which agreed on the name never clearly stated whether the standard was named after Pierre, Marie, or both).
- The element with atomic number 96 was named curium (symbol Cm).
- Three radioactive minerals are also named after the Curies: curite, sklodowskite, and cuprosklodowskite.
- The Marie Skłodowska-Curie Actions fellowship program of the European Union for young scientists wishing to work in a foreign country
- In 2007, a Paris Metro station (in Ivry) was renamed from Pierre Curie to Pierre et Marie Curie.
- The Marie-Curie station, a planned underground Réseau express métropolitain (REM) station in the borough of Saint-Laurent in Montreal is named in her honour. A nearby road, Avenue Marie Curie, is also named in her honour.
- The Polish research nuclear reactor Maria
- The 7000 Curie asteroid
- Marie Curie charity, in the United Kingdom
- The IEEE Marie Sklodowska-Curie Award, an international award presented for outstanding contributions to the field of nuclear and plasma sciences and engineering, was established by the Institute of Electrical and Electronics Engineers in 2008.
- The Marie Curie Medal, an annual science award established in 1996 and conferred by the Polish Chemical Society
- The Marie Curie–Sklodowska Medal and Prize, an annual award conferred by the London-based Institute of Physics for distinguished contributions to physics education
- Maria Curie-Skłodowska University in Lublin, Poland
- Pierre and Marie Curie University in Paris
- Maria Skłodowska-Curie National Research Institute of Oncology in Poland
- École élémentaire Marie-Curie in London, Ontario, Canada; Curie Metropolitan High School in Chicago, United States; Marie Curie High School in Ho Chi Minh City, Vietnam; Lycée français Marie Curie de Zurich, Switzerland; see Lycée Marie Curie for a list of other schools named after her.
- Rue Madame Curie in Beirut, Lebanon
- Beetle species – Psammodes sklodowskae Kamiński & Gearner

Numerous biographies are devoted to her, including:

- Ève Curie (Marie Curie's daughter), Madame Curie, 1938.
- Françoise Giroud, Marie Curie: A Life, 1987.
- Susan Quinn, Marie Curie: A Life, 1996.
- Barbara Goldsmith, Obsessive Genius: The Inner World of Marie Curie, 2005.
- Lauren Redniss, Radioactive: Marie and Pierre Curie, a Tale of Love and Fallout, 2011, adapted into the 2019 British film.
- Sobel, Dava (2024). The Elements of Marie Curie: How the Glow of Radium Lit a Path for Women in Science. Fourth Estate. ISBN 978-0-00-853691-6.

Marie Curie has been the subject of a number of films:

- 1943: Madame Curie, a U.S. Oscar-nominated film by Mervyn LeRoy starring Greer Garson.
- 1997: Les Palmes de M. Schutz, a French film adapted from a play of the same title, and directed by Claude Pinoteau. Marie Curie is played by Isabelle Huppert.
- 2014: Marie Curie, une femme sur le front, a French-Belgian film, directed by Alain Brunard and starring Dominique Reymond.
- 2016: Marie Curie: The Courage of Knowledge, a European co-production by Marie Noëlle starring Karolina Gruszka.
- 2016: Super Science Friends, an American Internet animated series created by Brett Jubinville with Hedy Gregor as Marie Curie.
- 2019: Radioactive, a British film by Marjane Satrapi starring Rosamund Pike.

Curie is the subject of the 2013 play False Assumptions by Lawrence Aronovitch, in which the ghosts of three other women scientists observe events in her life. Curie has also been portrayed by Susan Marie Frontczak in her play, Manya: The Living History of Marie Curie, a one-woman show which by 2014 had been performed in 30 U.S. states and nine countries. Lauren Gunderson's 2019 play The Half-Life of Marie Curie portrays Curie during the summer after her 1911 Nobel Prize victory, when she was grappling with depression and facing public scorn over the revelation of her affair with Paul Langevin.

The life of the scientist was also the subject of a 2018 Korean musical, titled Marie Curie. The show was since translated in English (as Marie Curie a New Musical) and has been performed several times across Asia and Europe, receiving its official Off West End premiere in London's Charing Cross Theatre in summer 2024.

Curie has appeared on more than 600 postage stamps in many countries across the world.

Between 1989 and 1996, she was depicted on a 20,000-złoty banknote designed by Andrzej Heidrich. In 2011, a commemorative 20-złoty banknote depicting Curie was issued by the National Bank of Poland on the 100th anniversary of the scientist receiving the Nobel Prize in Chemistry.

In 1994, the Bank of France issued a 500-franc banknote depicting Marie and Pierre Curie. Since 2024, Curie has been depicted on French 50 euro cent coins to commemorate her importance in French history.

On November 7, 2011, Curie was celebrated in a Google Doodle.

In 2025, the European Central Bank announced that Curie had been selected to appear on the obverse of twenty euro banknotes in a future redesign, were the theme "European culture" to be selected over "Rivers and birds".

Marie Curie was immortalized in at least one colour (Autochrome Lumière) photograph during her lifetime. It is archived in the Musée Curie in Paris.

In 2026, Curie and her daughter Irène were announced as among the 72 historical women in STEM whose names have been proposed to be added to the 72 men already celebrated on the Eiffel Tower. The plan was announced by the Mayor of Paris, Anne Hidalgo following the recommendations of a committee led by Isabelle Vauglin of Femmes et Sciences and Jean-François Martins, representing the operating company which runs the Eiffel Tower.

== See also ==
- Charlotte Hoffman Kellogg, who sponsored Marie Curie's visit to the US
- Eusapia Palladino: Spiritualist medium whose Paris séances were attended by an intrigued Pierre Curie and a sceptical Marie Curie
- List of female Nobel laureates
- List of female nominees for the Nobel Prize
- List of Poles in Chemistry
- List of Poles in Physics
- List of Polish Nobel laureates
- List of women associated with Marie Curie and Irène Joliot-Curie
- Skłodowski family
- Timeline of women in science
- Treatise on Radioactivity, by Marie Curie
- Women in chemistry
- Women in physics
