= Skłody-Piotrowice =

Village in Gmina Zaręby Kościelne, Poland

- Village
- Location within Poland
- Coordinates: 52°46′10″N 22°07′16″E
- Country: Poland
- Voivodeship: Masovian
- County: Ostrów
- Gmina: Zaręby Kościelne

Skłody-Piotrowice [ˈskwɔdɨ pjɔtrɔˈvit͡sɛ] is a village in the administrative district of Gmina Zaręby Kościelne, within Ostrów County, Masovian Voivodeship, in east-central Poland.
