= Helena Skłodowska-Szalay =

Polish educator, activist, and politician (1866–1961)

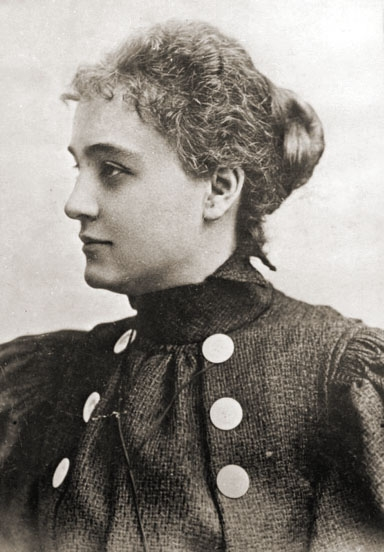
- Skłodowska-Szalay before 1914
- Born: Helena Skłodowska; 20 April 1866; Warsaw, Poland
- Died: 6 February 1961 (aged 94); Warsaw, Poland
- Occupation: Educator
- Notable work: Ze Wspomnień o Marii Skłodowskiej-Curie

Helena Skłodowska-Szalay (also known as Helena Szalayowa; 20 April 1866, Warsaw — 6 February 1961) was a Polish educator, inspector of Warsaw schools, educational activist, and a member of the women's election committee of the Nation-State Union political party. She is known for her memoirs of her sister, Marie Curie, and the school she established for girls in Warsaw.

== Life ==
Helena was born 20 April 1866 in Warsaw to Władysław Skłodowski and Bronisława Skłodowska, both of whom were teachers. She had three sisters — Zofia, Bronisława, and Marie, and a brother, Józef. Her parents were Polish nationalists, impoverished by their investments towards independence from Russia, especially the January Uprising of 1863-65, and the family lived in straitened circumstances. After her father was dismissed by the Russian authorities for his nationalist sentiment, the Skłodowskis had to take in boarders to supplement their income. After Marie was born in 1867, their mother retired from running a girls' boarding school in Warsaw. In 1875, her oldest sister Zofia died of typhus contracted from a lodger, and their mother succumbed to tuberculosis in 1878.

Helena attended Jadwiga Sikorska's school in Warsaw, and obtained a governess diploma. She taught mathematics at the Hoffmanowa high school. She was socially active, and in her youth, she belonged to the underground organization 'Kolo Kobiet Korony i Litwy, whose goal was to educate young workers and raise funds for political support. Through her contacts in the wealthy community whose children she minded, she was also involved in amateur drama, and even considered becoming a professional actor herself.

As tertiary education became restricted under Russian rule, especially for women, Helena and her sisters had to attend the Flying University in Warsaw, a clandestine organisation for higher studies, founded by Jadwiga Szczawińska-Dawidowa.

In 1891, Bronisława got married in Paris. Among the attendees at the civil ceremony was Stanislas Szalay, a chemist, who would later become Helena's husband. By 1894, Marie had graduated from the Sorbonne and was considering a return to Poland; she was interested in joining the Jagiellonian University in Kraków. Anticipating this, Helena, who was a private tutor for the Bujwid family, who moved to Kraków in 1893, wrote to the Faculty of Philosophy at the Jagiellonian University, asking if she could attend lectures in anorganic chemistry and experimental physics. The request was denied in 1894.

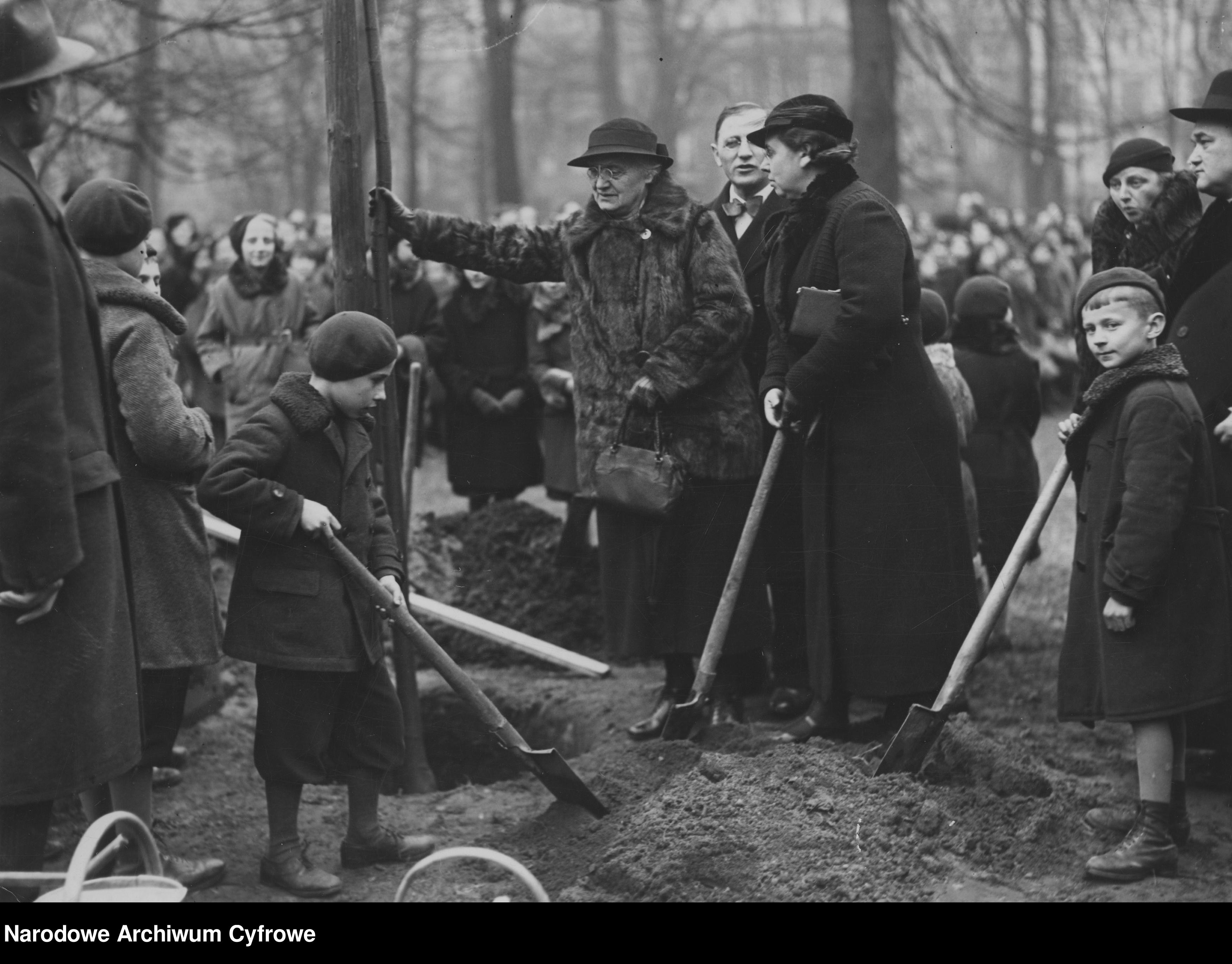
Helena Sklodowska-Szalay and students, April 1935

That same year, the Second Congress of Educators of the Kingdom of Poland was held. Polish-language education was only occurring in the Austro-Hungarian part of the country, while the rest had enforced Russian-medium education. The question of women's secondary and post-secondary education was raised. Helena, along with Paulina Kuczalska-Reinschmit, Stefania Sempołowska, and others, presented her views. The committee's views were adopted in the final resolutions of the congress.

In 1896, Helena married Stanislas Szalay. Their daughter Hanna was born the following year.

By 1913, she was a headmistress of a school run on behalf of the employees of the Warsaw trams. She established and operated several primary schools in the 1920s and 1930s, concentrating on systematic learning and preparing the students for secondary gymnasiums. Thereafter, she became a schools inspector.

Stanislas Szalay, who had been suffering from mental illness for years, died in January 1920. Helena's daughter, Hanna, suffered from depression and died at the age of forty-one.

After the Second World War, Helena continued to teach for several more years till past the age of 80. In her old age, her granddaughter Elżbieta Staniszkis lived with and looked after her.

Helena, along with her siblings Bronisława and Josef, had collected papers, letters and other archival material in connection with their sister Marie, and stored them at the Radium Institute in Warsaw. Most of these were lost during the Warsaw Uprising. Helena managed to publish Ze Wspomnień o Marii Skłodowskiej-Curie, her memoir of her scientist sister, in 1958.

Helena Skłodowska-Szalay died on 6 February 1961.

== Bibliography ==
- Cabaj, Jarosław (2005). "Zjazdy międzyzaborowe polskich środowisk naukowych i społeczno-zawodowych w latach 1869-1914. Cz. 2" (PDF). Kwartalnik Historii Nauki I Techniki (in Polish). 50 (1).
- Henry, Natacha (2005). Les Sœurs savantes. Marie Curie et Bronia Dluska, deux destins qui ont fait l'histoire (in French). La Librarie Vuibert. ISBN 9782311100938.
- Kabzińska, Krystyna (1994). Korespondencja Polska Marii Skłodowskiej-Curie 1881-1934.
- Niczanka, Monika (8 November 2018). "O Marii Skłodowskiej-Curie na Jej 151 urodziny" (in Polish). Nie dla chaosu w szkole.
- Pasachoff, Naomi (2000). "Marie Curie – Polish Girlhood (1867–1891) Part 1". American Institute of Physics. Archived from the original on 2 November 2011.
- Rafalska-Łasocha, Alicja (2015). Maria Skłodowska-Curie i jej kontakty ze środowiskiem krakowskim (Thesis). ISBN 978-83-7676-222-7.
- Twardowski, Kazimierz (1913). Ruch filozoficzny. Vol. 3–4.
- Skłodowska-Szalay, Helena (1958). Ze Wspomnień o Marii Skłodowskiej-Curie (in Polish). Warsaw: Nasza Księgarnia.
- Uziembło, Aniela (23 July 2012). "Helena Szalayowa z domu Skłodowska". Wyborcza.
- Wajs-Baryła, Ewelina (2 May 2019). "Ze wspomnień o Marii Skłodowskiej-Curie". Piękniejsza Strona Nauki.
- Wierzewski, Wojciech A. (21 June 2008). "Mazowieckie korzenie Marii" [Maria's Mazowsze Roots]. Gwiazda Polarna. 100 (13): 16–17. Archived from the original on March 21, 2009.
- Zborowski, Krzysztof K. (2011). "Marie Sklodowska-Curie: a brilliant child and a talented teacher". ARBOR Ciencia, Pensamiento y Cultura. 187: 11–17. doi:10.3989/arbor.2011.extran1111.
