= List of second-generation physicists =

The following is a list of parent-child pairs who were both notable for their contribution in physics and astronomy. The list is in alphabetical order by the parent's last name.

Four parent-child pairs have been awarded the Nobel Prize in Physics: J. J. and George Paget Thomson (1906, 1937), William H. and Lawrence Bragg (1915), Niels and Aage Bohr (1922,1975), Manne and Kai Siegbahn (1924,1981). Marie and Pierre Curie won together the Nobel Prize in Physics in 1903, Marie also won the 1911 Nobel Prize in Chemistry and their daughter Irène and her husband Frédéric Joliot-Curie won together the Nobel Prize in Chemistry in 1935.

== Two generations ==
Parent	Notable for	Child	Notable for
John Bardeen	BCS theory Transistor	William A. Bardeen	Top quark condensate
Jan Beenakker	Senftleben–Beenakker effect	Carlo Beenakker	
Johann Bernoulli	Catenary brachistochrone curve	Daniel Bernoulli	Bernoulli's principle
Claude Bloch	Bloch–Messiah decomposition	Jacqueline Bloch	Polariton condensate
Niels Bohr	Bohr model Complementarity Correspondence principle	Aage Bohr	Liquid drop model
William Cranch Bond		George Phillips Bond	
Claude Bouchiat		Vincent Bouchiat	
Marie-Anne Bouchiat		Hélène Bouchiat	
Georges Bruhat		Yvonne Choquet-Bruhat	Einstein field equations as a well-posed initial-value problem
William Henry Bragg	Bragg's law	Lawrence Bragg	Bragg's law
Marcel Brillouin		Léon Brillouin	Brillouin zone WKB approximation
Lord Charles Cavendish		Henry Cavendish	Cavendish experiment
Jacques Curie	Piezoelectricity Curie–von Schweidler law	Maurice Curie	
Jan Kazimierz Danysz		Marian Danysz	Discovery of hypernuclei
George Darwin	Darwin symbols	Charles Galton Darwin	Darwin drift Darwin term
Sidney Drell	Drell–Yan process	Persis Drell	
Paul Erman		Georg Adolf Erman	
Leonhard Euler	List of topics named after Leonhard Euler	Johann Euler	
William Garnett		Maxwell Garnett	Maxwell Garnett equation
Eduard Hagenbach-Bischoff		August Hagenbach	
Werner Heisenberg	Uncertainty principle Matrix mechanics	Jochen Heisenberg	
Robert Hofstadter	Hofstadter experiments	Douglas Hofstadter	Hofstadter's butterfly
John J. Hopfield	Hopfield bands in oxygen	John Hopfield	Hopfield network Hopfield dielectric
Helen Hopfield	Hopfield model of the troposphere	John Hopfield	Hopfield network Hopfield dielectric
Ryszard Horodecki	Peres–Horodecki criterion	Michał Horodecki	Peres–Horodecki criterion
Ryszard Horodecki	Peres–Horodecki criterion	Paweł Horodecki	Peres–Horodecki criterion
Robert Karplus		Beverly Karplus Hartline	
Gottfried Kirch		Christfried Kirch	
Maria Margaretha Kirch		Margaretha Kirch	
Maria Margaretha Kirch		Christine Kirch	
Margaret G. Kivelson		Steven Kivelson	
Hendrik Lorentz	Lorentz transformation Lorentz ether theory	Geertruida de Haas-Lorentz	Brownian noise
Reimar Lüst		Dieter Lüst	S-duality
Ernst Mach	Mach number	Ludwig Mach	Mach–Zehnder interferometer
Arkady Migdal	Landau–Pomeranchuk–Migdal effect	Alexander Migdal	
Franz Ernst Neumann	Neumann's law Magnetic vector potential	Carl Neumann	Neumann boundary condition
Jean Baptiste Perrin	Confirming Brownian motion Avogadro constant	Francis Perrin	
Robert Wichard Pohl	F-centers	Robert Otto Pohl	3ω-method
Vera Rubin	Dark matter	Judith Young	
Evry Schatzman	Wave heating theory	Michelle Schatzman	Chapman–Rubinstein–Schatzman model
Karl Schwarzschild	Schwarzschild metric	Martin Schwarzschild	Schwarzschild criterion
Manne Siegbahn	Siegbahn notation	Kai Siegbahn	Photoemission spectroscopy
Hans Thirring	Lense–Thirring precession	Walter Thirring	Thirring model Lieb–Thirring inequality Thirring–Wess model
J. J. Thomson	Discovery of the electron	George Paget Thomson	Electron diffraction
Harold Urey	Discovery of deuterium	Elizabeth Baranger	
Gregor Wentzel	WKB approximation	Donat Wentzel	
Gustav Heinrich Wiedemann	Wiedemann effect Wiedemann–Franz law	Eilhard Wiedemann	Luminescence
Louis Witten	Electrovacuum solution	Edward Witten	M-theory

== Multiple consecutive generations ==
- Antoine César Becquerel, known for the photovoltaic effect
  - Edmond Becquerel, known for first report of thermionic emission and the photovoltaic effect (with his father)
    - Henri Becquerel, known for the discovery of radioactivity
      - Jean Becquerel
- Blas Cabrera
  - Nicolás Cabrera, known for the BCF theory of crystal growth
    - Blas Cabrera Navarro
- Giovanni Domenico Cassini, known for the Cassini's laws and identifying the Cassini division
  - Jacques Cassini
    - César-François Cassini de Thury
      - Dominique, comte de Cassini
- Pierre (known for Curie's law and piezoelectricity) married to Marie Curie, both known for their work in radioactivity
  - Irène Joliot-Curie, daughter of Pierre and Marie Curie, married to Frederic Joliot-Curie, both known for induced radioactivity
    - Hélène Langevin-Joliot
      - Yves Langevin
- William Herschel, known for the discovery of Uranus
  - John Herschel, known for the actinometer and the cyanotype
    - Alexander Stewart Herschel, known for the Herschel graph
- Paris Pişmiş
  - Elsa Recillas
    - Irene Cruz-González
- Friedrich Georg Wilhelm von Struve, known for the Struve Geodetic Arc
  - Otto Wilhelm von Struve
    - Ludwig von Struve
      - Otto Struve
    - Hermann von Struve, known for the Struve function
      - Georg Hermann Struve
        - Wilfried Struve

== See also ==
- List of second-generation mathematicians
- Langevin family
- Curie family
- Bernoulli family
- Herschel family
- Struve family
