= Joliot-Curie =

Joliot-Curie (pronounced [ʒɔljo kyʁi]) is a surname shared by several notable people, among them being:

- Frédéric Joliot-Curie – French physicist and Nobel prize-winner
- Irène Joliot-Curie – his wife and joint prize-winner with her husband

== See also ==
- Joliot
- Curie
