= Joliot =

Joliot (English: /ʒɔːˈljoʊ/, French: [ʒɔljo]) is a surname. Notable people with the surname include:

- Frédéric Joliot-Curie (1900–1958), French radiochemist and Nobel laureate
- Hélène Langevin-Joliot (born 1927), French nuclear physicist
- Irène Joliot-Curie (1897–1956), French radiochemist and Nobel laureate, daughter of Marie Skłodowska-Curie and Pierre Curie
- Pierre Joliot (1932–2026), French biologist and researcher for the CNRS

== See also ==
- Joliot (crater), large lunar impact crater that lies on the far side of the Moon, just past the eastern limb
- Joliot-Curie Metro Station, station on the Sofia Metro in Bulgaria
