= Ștefania Mărăcineanu =

Romanian physicist (1882–1944)

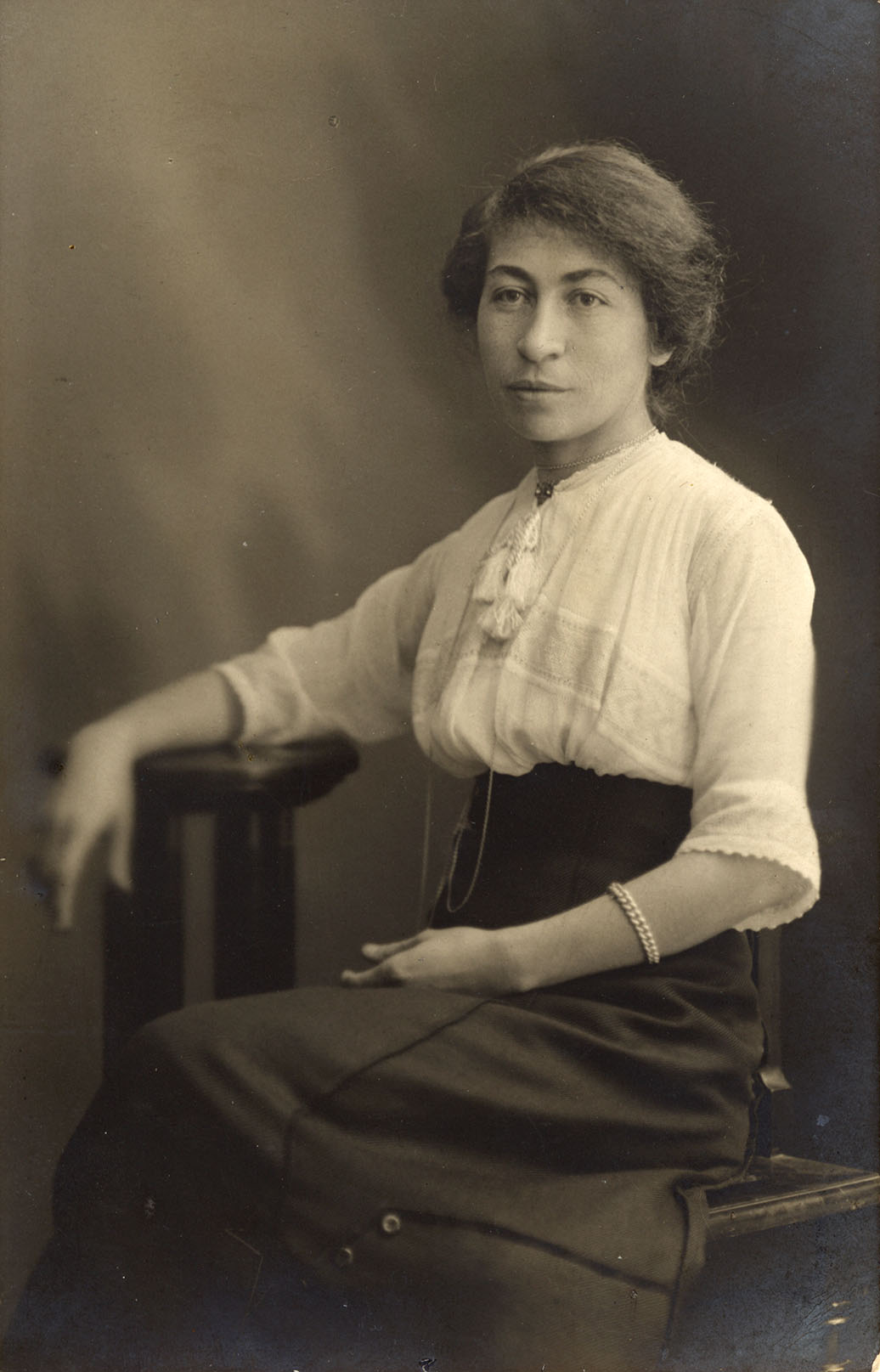
- Ștefania Mărăcineanu in 1913
- Born: June 18, 1882; Bucharest, Kingdom of Romania
- Died: March 15, 1944 (aged 61); Bucharest, Kingdom of Romania
- Resting place: Bellu Cemetery, Bucharest
- Education: University of Bucharest; Radium Institute
- Scientific career
- Workplaces: Central School for Girls; Radium Institute; Paris Observatory
- Thesis: Recherches sur la constante du polonium et sur la pénétration des substances radioactives dans les métaux (1924)
- Doctoral advisor: Marie Curie
- Website: www.stefania-maracineanu.ro

Ștefania Mărăcineanu (Romanian pronunciation: [ʃtefaˈni.a mə.rə'ʧi.ne̯a.nu]; June 18, 1882 – August 15, 1944) was a Romanian physicist. She worked with Marie Curie and studied polonium, which was named for Curie's homeland. She made proposals that later led to Irène Joliot-Curie's Nobel Prize. Mărăcineanu believed that Joliot-Curie had taken her work on induced radioactivity to receive the prize.

== Biography ==
=== Early life ===
"I have great esteem for the work that [Ștefania Mărăcineanu] has accomplished. In particular, she has acquired a perfect knowledge of precise electrometric measurements."

— Marie Curie

She was born in Bucharest, the daughter of Sebastian Mărăcineanu and Sevastia, both 20 years old. Not much is known about her personal life. She completed high school at the Central School for Girls in her native city. In 1907, she enrolled at the University of Bucharest, and received her degree in physical and chemical sciences in 1910. Her senior thesis, titled Light interference and its application to wavelength measurement, earned her a 300 lei prize. After graduation, she taught at high schools in Bucharest, Ploiești, Iași, and Câmpulung. In 1915, she secured a teaching position at the Central School for Girls in Bucharest, a position she held until 1940.

=== Work on radioactivity ===
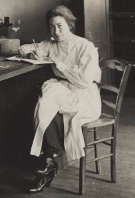
In the Curie laboratory in 1921

After World War I, with support from Constantin Kirițescu, Mărăcineanu obtained a fellowship that allowed her to travel to Paris to do further studies. In 1919 she took a course on radioactivity at the Sorbonne with Marie Curie. Afterwards, she pursued research with Curie at the Radium Institute until 1926. She received her Ph.D. from the Radium Institute. Her thesis, which was published in 1924, was read at the French Academy's session of June 23, 1923 by Georges Urbain. At the Institute, Mărăcineanu researched the half-life of polonium and devised methods of measuring alpha decay. This work led her to believe that radioactive isotopes could be formed from atoms as a result of exposure to polonium's alpha rays, an observation which would lead to the Joliot-Curies' 1935 Nobel Prize.

In 1935, Frederic and Irene Joliot-Curie (n.r. – daughter of scientists Pierre Curie and Marie Curie) won the Nobel Prize in Chemistry discovery of artificial radioactivity, although all data show that Mărăcineanu was the first to make it. In fact, Ștefania Mărăcineanu expressed her dismay at the fact that Irene Joliot-Curie had used a large part of her work observations regarding artificial radioactivity, without mentioning it. Mărăcineanu publicly claimed that she discovered artificial radioactivity during her years of research in Paris, as evidenced by her doctoral dissertation, presented more than 10 years earlier. Mărăcineanu wrote to Lise Meitner in 1936, expressing her disappointment that Irene Joliot Curie, without her knowledge, used much of her work, especially that related to artificial radioactivity, in her work. This was mentioned in the book A devotion to their science: Pioneer women of radioactivity.

Mărăcineanu also investigated the possibility of sunlight inducing radioactivity with French astronomer Henri-Alexandre Deslandres, work which was contested by other researchers. A 1927 article from the Geraldton Guardian remarked:

Cheaper radium is foreshadowed in a communication to the French Academy of Sciences by a girl scientist, Mlle. Maricaneanu[sic], who [...] by means of lengthy laboratory experiments, has been able to demonstrate that lead exposed for a long time to the sun recovers its radioactive properties. The mechanism of this transformation [...] is a complete mystery but it is regarded of such tremendous importance to medical science that further close research work is to be pursued.

Mărăcineanu went on to work at the Paris Observatory until 1929, after which she returned to Romania, and started teaching at the University of Bucharest. She performed experiments investigating the link between radioactivity and rainfall, and rainfall with earthquakes.

On 29 November 1935, Nicolae Vasilescu-Karpen gave a lecture at the Romanian Academy of Sciences on Artificial radioactivity and Romanian works in this field, which contained clear allusions to Mărăcineanu's research done in previous years. On 24 June 1936, she asked the Academy of Sciences to recognize the priority of her work. Her request was granted, and on 21 December 1937 she was elected corresponding member of the Romanian Academy of Sciences, Physics section. In 1937 she was named Director of Research by the Academy, and in 1941 she was promoted to Associate Professor.

=== Later life ===
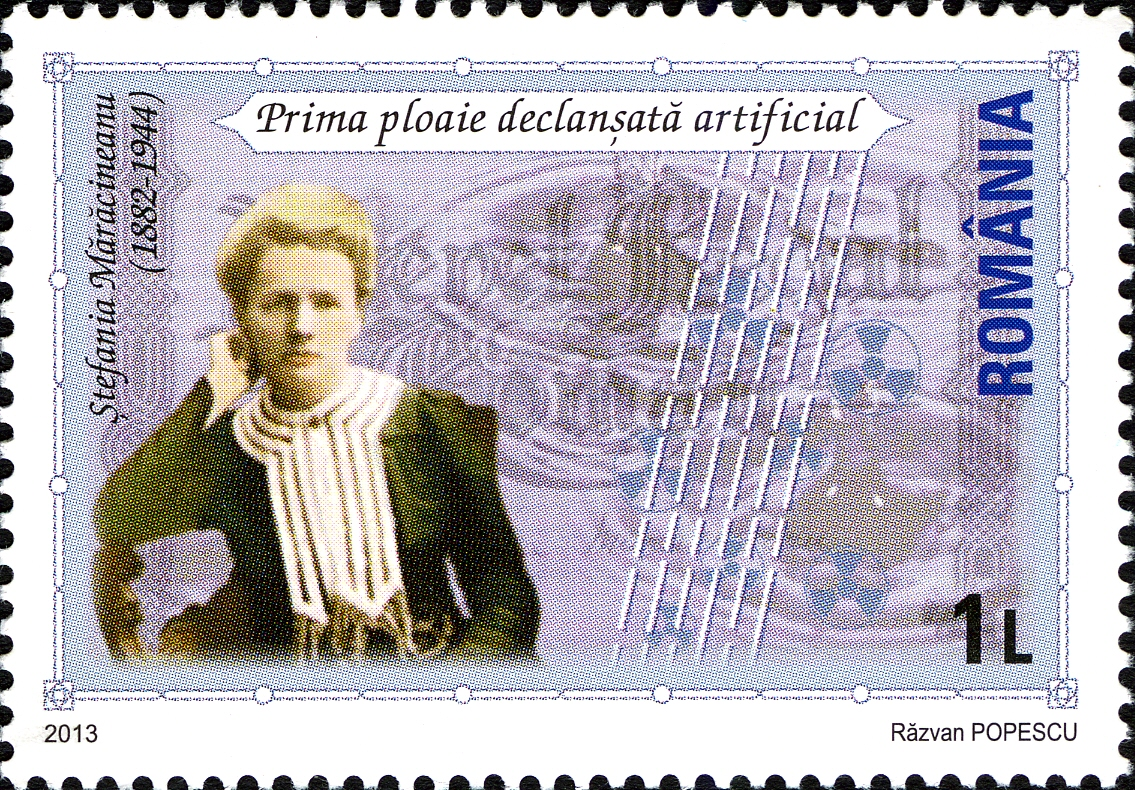
Postage stamp of Romania from 2013. Erroneously shown as Mărăcineanu is a photograph of Marie Curie.

Mărăcineanu was mandatorily retired when she reached age 60, in 1942. She died in 1944 of cancer, reportedly due to radiation exposure. According to some sources, she is buried at Bellu Cemetery in Bucharest, though other sources disagree on this point.

== See also ==
- List of women associated with Marie Curie and Irène Joliot-Curie
