= Pierre Aigrain =

French physicist (1924–2002)

- Born: 28 September 1924
- Died: 30 October 2002 (aged 78)
- Education: Carnegie Institute of Technology
- Scientific career
- Fields: Thermophotovoltaics

Pierre Aigrain (28 September 1924 – 30 October 2002) was a French physicist and Secretary of Research in the French Academy of Sciences.

== Education ==
The son of an engineer, Pierre Aigrain completed his secondary education in Metz before studying at naval school between 1942 and 1945. In 1945 he became a naval officer at just 21 years old and was sent to study in Norfolk, Virginia, USA. After which he became a Ship-of-the-line lieutenant in Memphis. In 1946 he was accepted to the Carnegie Institute of Technology in Pittsburgh to study towards a master's degree. He then joined the Department of Electrical Engineering, where Professor F. M. Williams got him a research associate position to prepare a PhD in Electrical Engineering, a certificate he obtained in 1948.

In September 1948, Aigrain met Claude Dugas at the Carnegie Institute of Technology who had been sent by Yves Rocard on a French National Centre for Scientific Research (CNRS) grant to work with Frederick Seitz then Head of the Physics Department. It was during his studies in Pittsburgh that he met his future wife, Francine Bogart (deceased in 2009), whom he married on February 12, 1947 in New York.

== Career ==
Back in France he was assigned to the physics laboratory of the École normale supérieure, directed by Rocard, as technical assistant to the Marine Research Center Director (1948–1949). He was working on the physics of germanium transistors.

Following this he was an engineer at the French Atomic Energy Commission (CEA) between the years 1949-1950, then an assistant at the Collège de France to Jean Laval, Professor of theoretical physics, from 1950 to 1951. Then he went back to engineering at the CEA from 1951-1952. At the age of 26 in 1950, Aigrain obtained a Ph.D. in Physics from the Faculty of Science at the University of Paris. He created a small research team in the physics laboratory of the École normale supérieure with Claude Dugas to conduct research on semiconductors which went on to become the school's laboratory for solid-state physics, he would go on to lead this team until 1965. It is here where Pierre-Gilles de Gennes studied for his graduate degree.

In 1952, aged 28, he resigned from the French Navy and became a temporary lecturer in theoretical physics at the Science Faculty of the University of Lille, all while remaining attached to the Physics Department at the École normale supérieure where he was also lecturing between 1952-1953. On 1 October 1954, he became a permanent lecturer at the University of Paris's Science Faculties for the teaching of the PCB certificate (Certificat d'études physiques, chimiques et biologiques, English: Certificate of physical, chemical and biological sciences) alongside Maurice Curie, Jean-Paul Mathieu and André Guinier, then Paul Soleillet and Jean Brossel. He obtained a senior lecturing role on 1 January 1957 and was then appointed full Professor of Electrical Engineering by 1 October 1958 after the retirement of Marcel Pauthenier. By 1 October 1963, Aigrain was transferred to the Atomic Energy Department. Furthermore, in 1955 he participated in the establishment of the third cycle of solid-state physics with Jacques Friedel and André Guinier, and in atomic and statistical physics with Brossel, Alfred Kastler, Jacques Yvon, de Gennes and Claude Cohen- Tannoudji.

== Works ==
- About a simple man of science, Hermann Editions, 1983, ISBN 2-7056-5957-9

== Awards ==
- Winner of the 1957 Blondel Medal awarded by the Society of electricity, electronics and information technology and communication.
- Elected member of the American Academy of Arts and Sciences in 1961.
- Elected member to the United States National Academy of Sciences in 1974.
- Received Tate Medal in 1981, in recognition of his contributions to the growth of science on an international scale. His research has had a major impact on the advance and application of solid state physics throughout the world.
- Elected member of the American Philosophical Society in 1981.
- Received an Honorary Doctorate from Heriot-Watt University in 1987.
