= Curie family =

French family

- Members: Jacques Curie; Pierre Curie; Marie Skłodowska-Curie; Maurice Curie; Bronisława Dłuska; Kazimierz Dłuski; Helena Skłodowska-Szalay; Józef Władysław Skłodowski; Irène Joliot-Curie; Frédéric Joliot-Curie; Ève Curie; Henry Richardson Labouisse, Jr.; Hélène Langevin-Joliot; Pierre Joliot-Curie
- Connected families: Skłodowski family; Bernoulli family; Langevin family
- Distinctions: biology; chemistry; diplomacy; humanism; humanitarianism; journalism; literature; mathematics; medicine; music; natural sciences; physics

The Curie family is a French family from which hailed a number of distinguished scientists. Polish-born Marie Skłodowska-Curie from the Skłodowski family, her French husband Pierre Curie, their daughter, Irène Joliot-Curie, and son-in-law, Frédéric Joliot-Curie, are its most prominent members. Five members of the family in total were awarded a Nobel Prize, with Marie winning twice.

Marie and Pierre shared a Nobel Prize in Physics in 1903 and Marie was awarded a second one in chemistry in 1911, making her the first person in history to win a Nobel Prize in two scientific disciplines. To date, only Linus Pauling has followed her in winning prizes in multiple categories, in chemistry and peace. Irène and Frédéric Joliot-Curie won the Nobel Prize in Chemistry in 1935. Henry Richardson Labouisse, Jr., the spouse of Irène's younger sister, Ève Curie, was awarded the Nobel Peace Prize in 1965.

The chemical element curium (number 96) is named after Marie and Pierre.

While Pierre Curie died at age 46 from an accident, Marie, Irène and Frédéric died from diseases likely caused by their exposure to radiation during their scientific experiments.

The Curie were close friends or associated to of other famous academic and scientific families including the Borels (Émile Borel and Camille Marbo), the Cottons (Aimé and Eugénie), the Langevin family, the Perrins (including Jean and Henriette) and the Weiss (Pierre and Marthe).

== List of notable members ==
- Paul Curie (medical doctor)
  - Eugène Curie (medical doctor)
    - Pierre Curie (physicist, Nobel laureate in Physics), married to Marie Curie (physicist, Nobel laureate in Physics and Chemistry)
      - Irène Joliot-Curie, married to Frederic Joliot-Curie (both physicists, Nobel laureates in Chemistry)
        - Hélène Langevin-Joliot (physicist), married to Michel Langevin (physicist)
          - Yves Langevin (astrophysicist)
        - Pierre Joliot (biologist)
      - Ève Curie (writer), married to Henry Richardson Labouisse Jr. (diplomat, Peace Nobel laureate)
    - Jacques Curie (physicist)
      - Maurice Curie (physicist)
        - Daniel Curie (physicist)

For the family of Marie Curie, see Skłodowski family.

=== Family tree ===
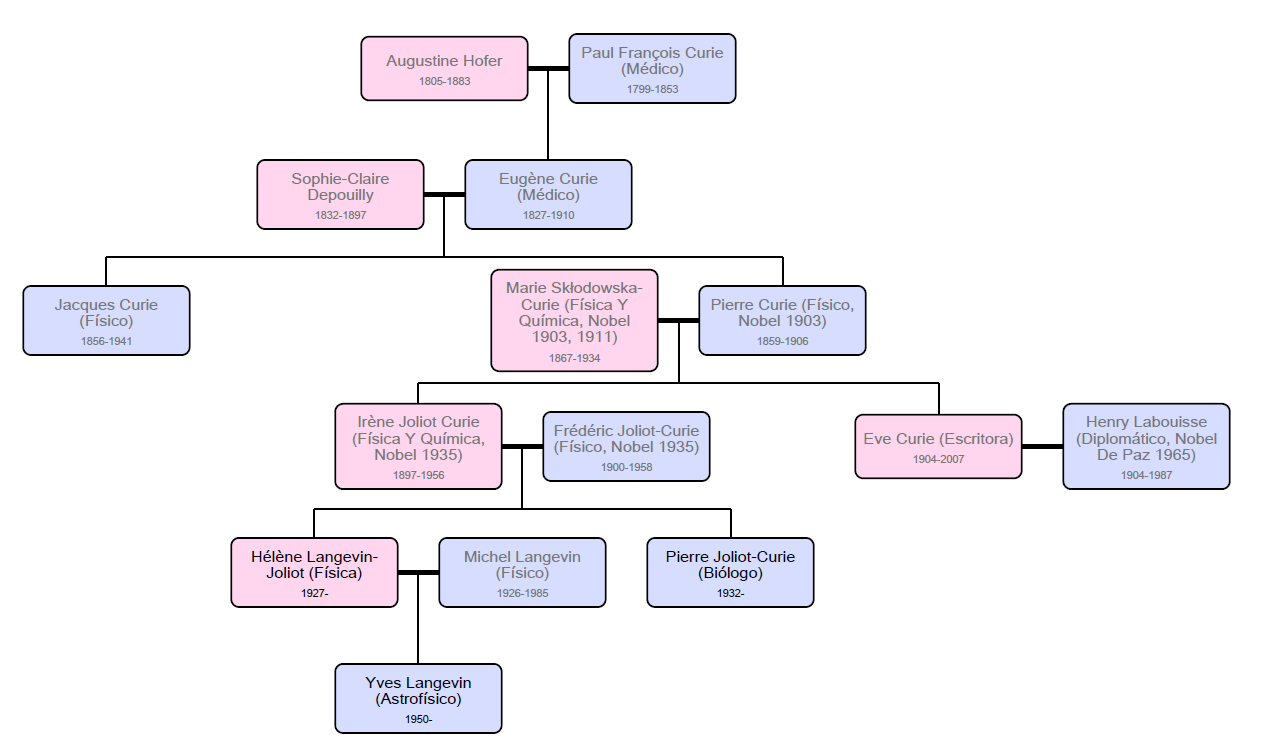
Family tree

== See also ==
- Bernoulli family
- List of second-generation physicists
