= Pierre Joliot =

French biochemist (1932–2026)

Pierre Adrien Joliot-Curie
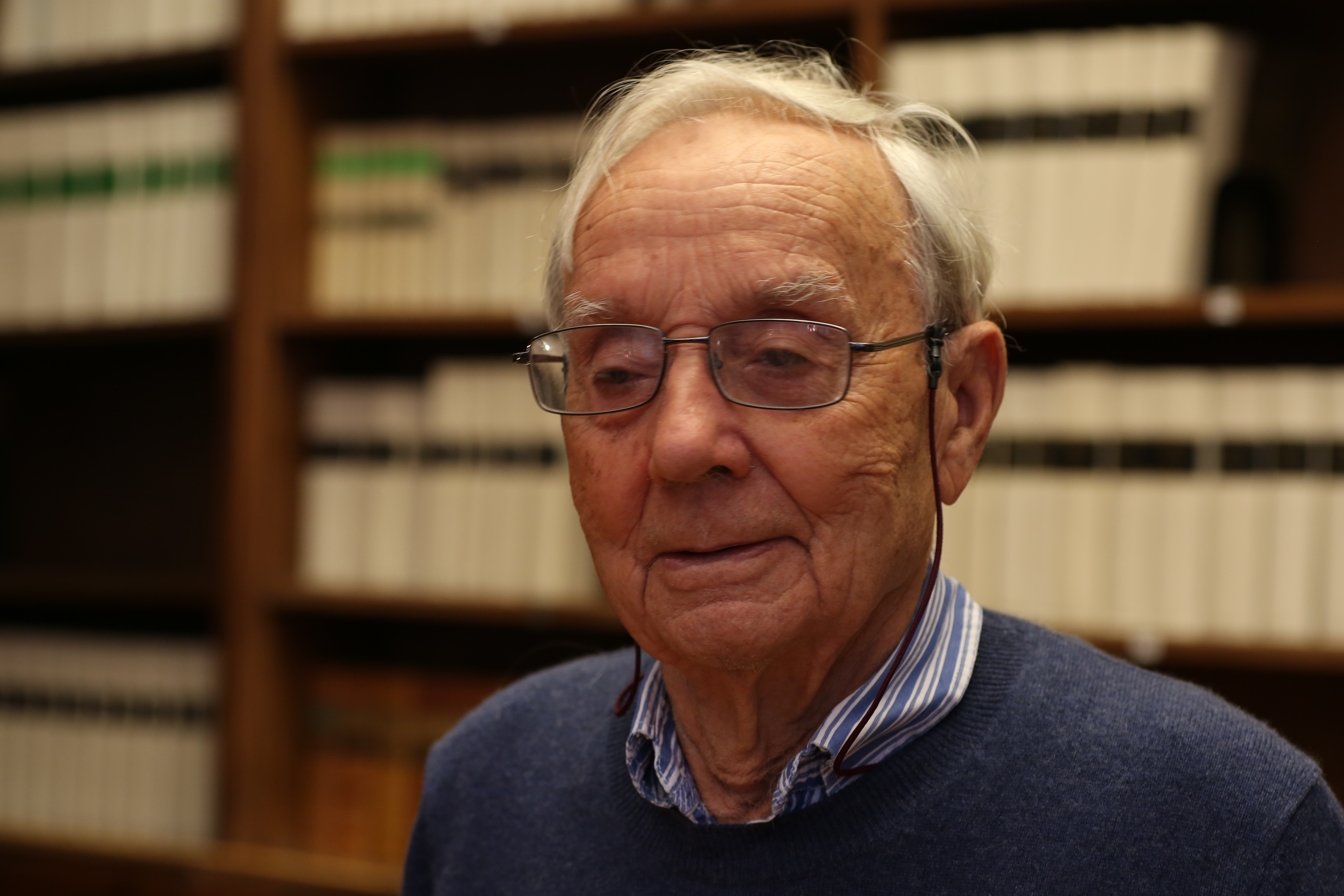
- Born: 12 March 1932; Paris, France
- Died: 10 October 2026 (aged 94); Paris, France
- Spouse: Anne Gricouroff
- Children: 2
- Parents: Irène Joliot-Curie; Frédéric Joliot-Curie
- Family: Curie
- Awards: Ordre National du Mérite; Légion d'honneur
- Scientific career
- Fields: Biochemistry
- Workplaces: CNRS

Pierre Adrien Joliot-Curie (French: [pjɛʁ adʁjɛ̃ ʒɔljo kyʁi]; 12 March 1932 – 10 October 2026) was a French biologist and researcher for the French National Centre for Scientific Research, specialising in photosynthesis. A researcher there since 1956, he became a Director of Research in 1974 and a member of their scientific council in 1992. He was a scientific advisor to the French Prime Minister from 1985 to 1986 and was a member of Academia Europæa. He was made a commander of the Ordre National du Mérite (English: the National Order of Merit) in 1982 and of the Légion d'honneur (English: Legion of Honor) in 1984.

== Life and career ==
Joliot came from the Curie family science dynasty. His grandparents, Marie Sklodowska-Curie and Pierre Curie together with Henri Becquerel won the Nobel Prize in Physics in 1903 for their study of radioactivity. Marie also won the Nobel Prize in Chemistry in 1911. Joliot's parents, Irène Joliot-Curie and Frédéric Joliot-Curie, won the Nobel Prize in Chemistry in 1935 for their discovery of induced radioactivity. His sister, Hélène Langevin-Joliot, is a noted nuclear physicist.

He held the Chair of Cellular Bioenergetics (1981–2002) at the Collège de France and was emeritus professor. He was also a member of the Academy of Science of France. In 2002, he published a work about his views on the research system, 'La Recherche Passionnément' (English: Research Passionately).

Joliot was married to biologist Anne (née Gricouroff) Joliot-Curie and they had two sons. He died on 10 October 2026, at the age of 94.
