= Induced radioactivity =

Process to make stable elements radioactive

Induced radioactivity, also called artificial radioactivity or man-made radioactivity, is the process of using radiation to make a previously stable material radioactive.

Neutron activation is the main form of induced radioactivity. It occurs when an atomic nucleus captures one or more free neutrons. This new, heavier isotope may be either stable or unstable (radioactive), depending on the chemical element involved. Because neutrons disintegrate within minutes outside of an atomic nucleus, free neutrons can be obtained only from nuclear decay, nuclear reaction, and high-energy interaction, such as cosmic radiation or particle accelerator emissions. Neutrons that have been slowed through a neutron moderator (thermal neutrons) are more likely to be captured by nuclei than fast neutrons.

A less common form of induced radioactivity results from removing a neutron by photodisintegration. In this reaction, a high energy photon (a gamma ray) strikes a nucleus with an energy greater than the binding energy of the nucleus, which releases a neutron. This reaction has a minimum cutoff of 2 MeV (for deuterium) and around 10 MeV for most heavy nuclei. Many radionuclides do not produce gamma rays with energy high enough to induce this reaction. The isotopes used in food irradiation (cobalt-60, caesium-137) both have energy peaks below this cutoff and thus cannot induce radioactivity in the food.

The conditions inside certain types of nuclear reactors with high neutron flux can induce radioactivity. The components in those reactors may become highly radioactive from the radiation to which they are exposed. Induced radioactivity increases the amount of nuclear waste that must eventually be disposed, but it is not referred to as radioactive contamination unless it is uncontrolled.

The husband-and-wife team of Irène and Frédéric Joliot-Curie discovered induced radioactivity in 1934, and they shared the 1935 Nobel Prize in Chemistry for this discovery.

== History ==
Irène Curie began her research with her parents, Marie and Pierre Curie, studying the natural radioactivity found in radioactive isotopes. Irene branched off from the Curies to study turning stable isotopes into radioactive isotopes by bombarding the stable material with alpha particles (denoted α). In 1934, the Joliot-Curies showed that when lighter elements, such as boron and aluminium, were bombarded with α-particles, the lighter elements continued to emit radiation even after the α−source was removed. They showed that this radiation consisted of particles carrying one unit positive charge with mass equal to that of an electron, now known as a positron.

Further research originally done by Irene and Frederic Joliot-Curie has led to modern techniques to treat various types of cancers.

=== Mărăcineanu's work ===
After World War I, with support from Constantin Kirițescu, Ștefania Mărăcineanu obtained a fellowship that allowed her to travel to Paris to further her studies. In 1919 she took a course on radioactivity at the Sorbonne with Marie Curie. Afterwards, she pursued research with Curie at the Radium Institute until 1926. Mărăcineanu received her Ph.D. at the institute, where she researched the half-life of polonium and devised methods of measuring alpha decay. This work led her to believe that radioactive isotopes could be formed from atoms as a result of exposure to polonium's alpha rays, an observation which would lead to the Joliot-Curies' 1935 Nobel Prize.

In 1935, Frederic and Irene Joliot-Curie (n.r.—daughter of scientists Pierre Curie and Marie Curie) won the Nobel Prize in Chemistry for the discovery of artificial radioactivity. Ștefania Mărăcineanu expressed her dismay at the fact that Irene Joliot-Curie had used a large part of her work observations regarding artificial radioactivity, without mentioning it. Mărăcineanu publicly claimed that she discovered artificial radioactivity during her years of research in Paris, as evidenced by her doctoral dissertation, presented more than 10 years earlier. "Mărăcineanu wrote to Lise Meitner in 1936, expressing her disappointment that Irene Joliot Curie, without her knowledge, used much of her work, especially that related to artificial radioactivity, in her work," is mentioned in the book A devotion to their science: Pioneer women of radioactivity.

Historians, however, have thrown doubt on the claims of Mărăcineanu.

== See also ==
- Radiocarbon dating
