= Irène Joliot-Curie =

French chemist and physicist (1897–1956)

- Joliot-Curie in 1925
- Born: Irène Curie; 12 September 1897; Paris, French Third Republic
- Died: 17 March 1956 (aged 58); Paris, French Fourth Republic
- Education: University of Paris
- Known for: Discovering induced radioactivity Positron emission
- Spouse: Frédéric Joliot (m. 1926)
- Children: Hélène; Pierre
- Parents: Pierre Curie; Maria Skłodowska
- Family: Curie
- Awards: Nobel Prize in Chemistry (1935)
- Scientific career
- Fields: Chemistry; Physics
- Workplaces: University of Paris; Radium Institute
- Thesis: Recherches sur les rayons α du polonium : oscillation de parcours, vitesse d'émission, pouvoir ionisant (1925)
- Doctoral advisor: Paul Langevin
- Doctoral students: Her children Henriette Mathieu-Faraggi

Irène Joliot-Curie (French: [iʁɛn ʒɔljo kyʁi]; née Curie; 12 September 1897 – 17 March 1956) was a French chemist and physicist who received the 1935 Nobel Prize in Chemistry with her husband, Frédéric Joliot-Curie, for their discovery of induced radioactivity, also known as artificial radioactivity. The couple also discovered positron emission during their research. They were the second married couple, after her parents, to win the prize, adding to the Curie family's unbeaten legacy of four Nobel Prizes.

The eldest child of scientists Marie and Pierre Curie, Irène grew up showing talent in mathematics and received a rigorous education from her mother and other prominent French scholars as part of a private cooperative of students. She served as a nurse radiographer at battlefield hospitals during World War I, supervising mobile X-ray units and teaching doctors how to locate shrapnel in wounds using radiology. In 1918, she joined her mother at the Radium Institute in Paris, conducting research on the alpha decay of polonium for her doctorate in 1925.

Irène and her husband jointly studied atomic nuclei during the 1930s, and they contributed directly to the creation of the first French nuclear reactor in 1948. She was one of the first three women to be appointed a member of a French government, becoming undersecretary for scientific research under the Popular Front in 1936. In 1945, she was one of six commissioners of the newly established French Alternative Energies and Atomic Energy Commission (CEA) created by de Gaulle and the Provisional Government of the French Republic. Both children of the Joliot-Curies, Hélène and Pierre, also became scientists.

Irène Joliot-Curie died in Paris on 17 March 1956 from acute leukemia linked to her long-term exposure to polonium and X-rays. The annual Prix Joliot-Curie and Irène Joliot-Curie Prize are named in her honour. In 2026, Irène Joliot-Curie was announced as one of 72 historical women in STEM whose names were proposed to be added to the 72 men already celebrated on the Eiffel Tower.

== Biography ==
=== Early life and education ===
Irène Curie was born in Paris, France, on 12 September 1897. The first of Marie and Pierre's two daughters, her sister Ève was born in 1904. After they lost their father in April 1906 in a horse-drawn wagon accident, Marie was left to raise them with the help of her father-in-law, Eugene Curie, who had played an active role in their lives since the girls were born. Eugene was anti-clerical republican who opposed the political control of aristocrats and religious authorities, and his views influenced Irène's own beliefs. He taught her to appreciate poetry, the natural world, and radical politics. Irène had a close relationship with her grandfather until his death in 1910.

As education was important to Marie, she enrolled Irène in a school near the Paris Observatory that had a more demanding curriculum than the school closer to the family home. In 1906, when Irène showed she was talented in mathematics, her mother chose to change her focus rather than following the normal public school curriculum. Marie therefore joined forces with a number of eminent scholars, including the prominent French physicists Paul Langevin and Jean Perrin, to form "The Cooperative", a private gathering of 10 students – Irène included – who were children of the most distinguished academics in France. Each contributed to educating the children in their respective homes. The curriculum of The Cooperative was diverse and wide-ranging; alongside science the students also studied subjects such as sculpture and Chinese language. They were also granted sufficient time and opportunities to enjoy sports and outdoor activities.

Irène and her sister Ève were sent to Poland to spend the summer with their Aunt Bronia (Marie's sister) in 1911. Irène's education was so rigorous that she still had daily German and trigonometry lessons throughout the break. In 1912, Marie's health was poor; she spent most of the next year and a half in sanitoriums, entrusting the care of her daughters to a Polish governess, which provided opportunities for them to work on their Polish language skills. During the fall of 1912, Irène and her sister spent time at the Hampshire home of Hertha Ayrton, a British physicist and suffragette who was friends with Marie. Ayrton tutored Irène in mathematics and encouraged her to develop an interest in women's rights movements.

Irène subsequently re-entered a more orthodox learning environment, attending high school at the Collège Sévigné in central Paris. She studied German and English language alongside French. From 1914, she attended the Faculty of Science at the Sorbonne to complete a baccalaureate in mathematics and physics but was forced to pause her studies in 1916 as the events of World War I led to new responsibilities for the Curie family.

=== World War I ===
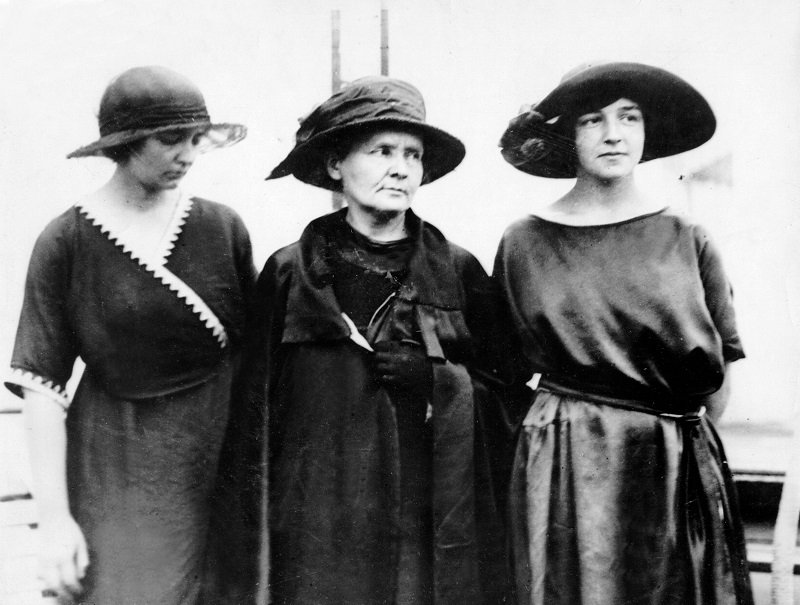
Irène (left), her mother and her sister Ève Curie

During the war, Irène took a nursing course and went to work as a nurse radiographer at battlefield hospitals alongside her mother. They supervised 20 mobile X-ray units and set up approximately 200 X-ray centres for injured soldiers.After a few months, Irène was left to work alone at a radiological facility in Belgium. She taught doctors how to locate shrapnel in wounds using radiology and became skilled in repairing the equipment herself. She also trained another 150 women in technical skills for X-ray use in the field. She moved between facilities and battlegrounds including Furnes, Ypres, and Amiens. In 1918, she received the Médaille militaire for her assistance in X-ray facilities in France and Belgium.

Irène's radiography work was not without risks. The tuberculosis she suffered during the course of her wartime efforts, remained a health concern over the next two decades. Her heavy exposure to doses of radiation also left her open to the eventual development of other illnesses, such as leukemia, which later contributed to her death.

After the war, Irène returned to the Sorbonne in Paris to complete her baccalaureate degree.

=== Research ===
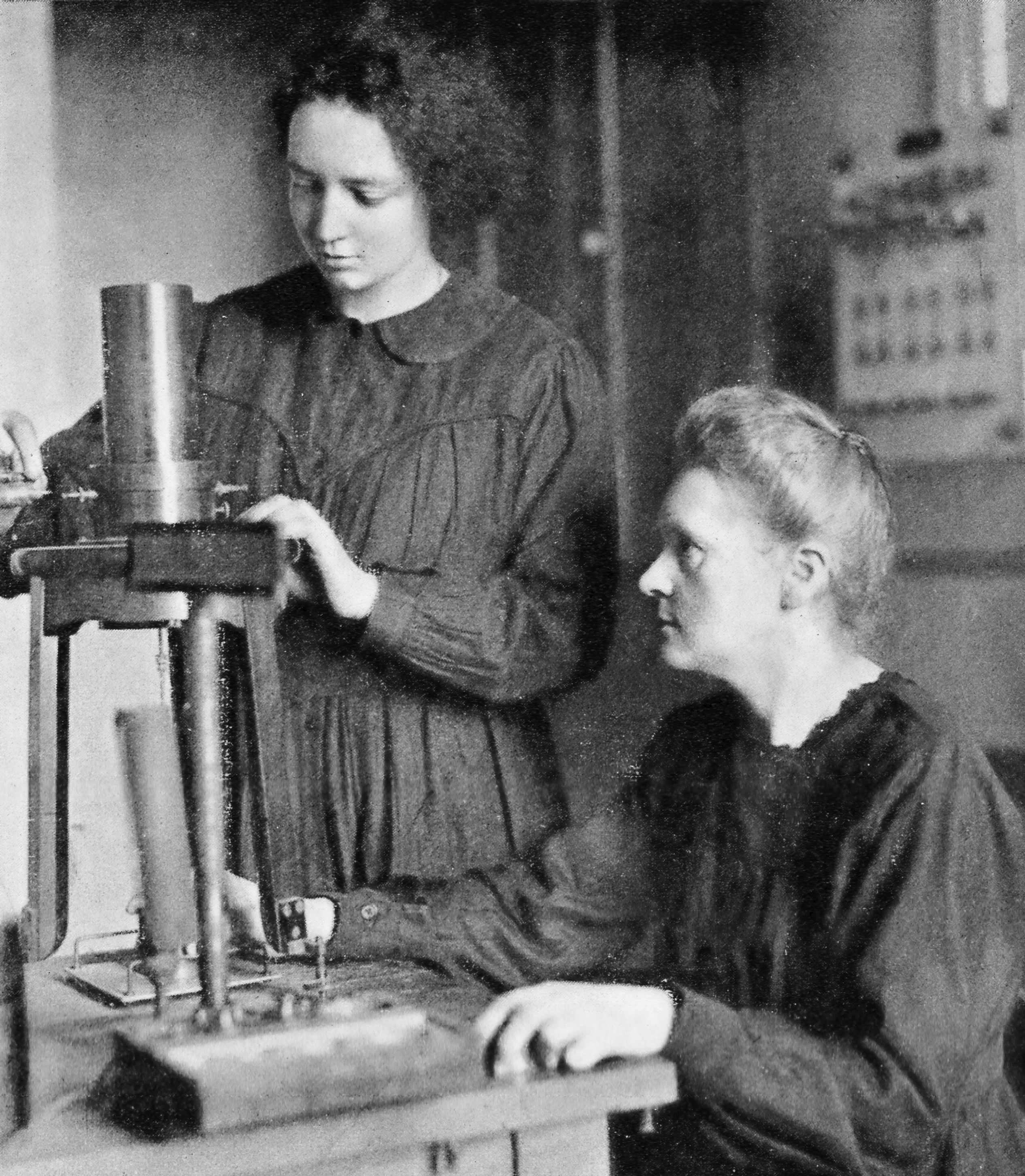
Irène and Marie Curie in 1925

==== Early work: 1918–1929 ====
In March 1918, Irène Curie joined the Radium Institute in Paris where she initially assisted her mother in her research. She taught radiology courses to students who were in training as medical technicians. During the years she was at the Institute, those she mentored or assisted included Catherine Chamié, Marthe Klein, Marguerite Perey, Angèle Pompéi, Alice Prebil, Elizabeth Rona, Suzanne Veil and Lucienne Wisner.

In 1921, Irène published her first physics paper. That year, she accompanied her mother and her sister Ève on a trip to the United States during which Marie hoped to obtain a gram of radium to continue her research. In view of her mother's poor health following a heart attack, Irène stepped in to cover some of her assignments, for example by delivering a lecture at Bryn Mawr College, Pennsylvania. On 23 May 1921, on behalf of her mother, she accepted an honorary degree from the University of Pennsylvania.

In early 1925, as she neared the end of her doctorate, Irène Curie was asked to teach the precision laboratory techniques required for radiochemical research to the young chemical engineer Frédéric Joliot (whom she eventually married on 9 October 1926). She became a Doctor of Science in March 1925 with a thesis addressing the alpha decay of polonium, an element discovered by her parents and named after Marie's country of birth, Poland. Public curiosity about the daughter of Marie Curie was high, and Irène's dissertation defense in a Sorbonne auditorium was attended by a thousand spectators.

Irène Curie in May 1921 on accepting an honorary degree at the University of Pennsylvania on behalf of her mother

==== Atomic research and Nobel Prize: 1930–1937 ====
During the early 1930s, Joliot-Curie and her husband, Frédéric, combined their research efforts on the study of atomic nuclei. In 1932, thanks to their full access to Marie's polonium, they conducted experiments with gamma rays to identify the positron. Though their experiments identified both the positron and the neutron, they failed to interpret the significance of the results and the discoveries were later claimed by Carl David Anderson and James Chadwick respectively. That year, Irène took over the title of chef de travaux (head of operations) at the Radium Institute from her mother.

In 1933, Joliot-Curie and her husband were the first to calculate accurately the mass of the neutron. The couple continued trying to make a name in the scientific community; in doing so, they developed a new theory based on an experiment in which aluminium was bombarded with alpha rays, leading to their discovery that only protons were detected. Based on the undetectable electron and positron pair, they proposed that the protons changed into neutrons and positrons. Later in October 1933, this new theory was presented to the Seventh Solvay Conference. The Solvay Conferences consisted of prominent scientists in the physics and chemistry community. Irène and her husband presented their theory and results to their fellow scientists, but received criticism of their findings from most of the 45 scientists attending. Fellow scientist Lise Meitner and her colleagues had attempted similar experiments to that of the Joliot-Curies but had not achieved results that would support their findings. Many in the group believed that the Joliot-Curies had rushed or otherwise formed mistaken conclusions.

In 1934, the couple discovered a process allowing them to investigate induced radioactivity. Building on the work of Marie and Pierre Curie, who had isolated naturally occurring radioactive elements, the Joliot-Curies succeeded in transforming one element into another by creating radioactive nitrogen from boron, radioactive isotopes of phosphorus from aluminium, and silicon from magnesium. Irradiating the natural stable isotope of aluminium with alpha particles (i.e. helium nuclei) resulted in an unstable isotope of phosphorus: ^{27}Al + ^{4}He → ^{30}P + ^{1}n. This phosphorus isotope is not found in nature and decays emitting a positron. The discovery is formally known as positron emission or beta decay, where a proton in the radioactive nucleus changes to a neutron and releases a positron and an electron neutrino. As the application of radioactive materials for use in medicine was growing at the time, the discovery allowed radioactive materials to be created quickly, cheaply, and plentifully. The Nobel Prize for chemistry in 1935 brought with it recognition from the scientific community and led to Joliot-Curie being awarded a professorship at the Sorbonne's Faculty of Science.

The importance of these scientific successes was somewhat diminished by the death of Marie Curie on 4 July 1934. As a result, Irène took on many of her mother's former responsibilities at the Radium Institute. The Joliot-Curies began focusing more on separate projects: while Frédéric received a posting at the Collège de France, Irène continued working at the Radium Institute, now with the status of a professor at the Sorbonne. After 1934, she increasingly suffered from tuberculosis and often had to take weeks or months of extended rest, although she continued working whenever possible.

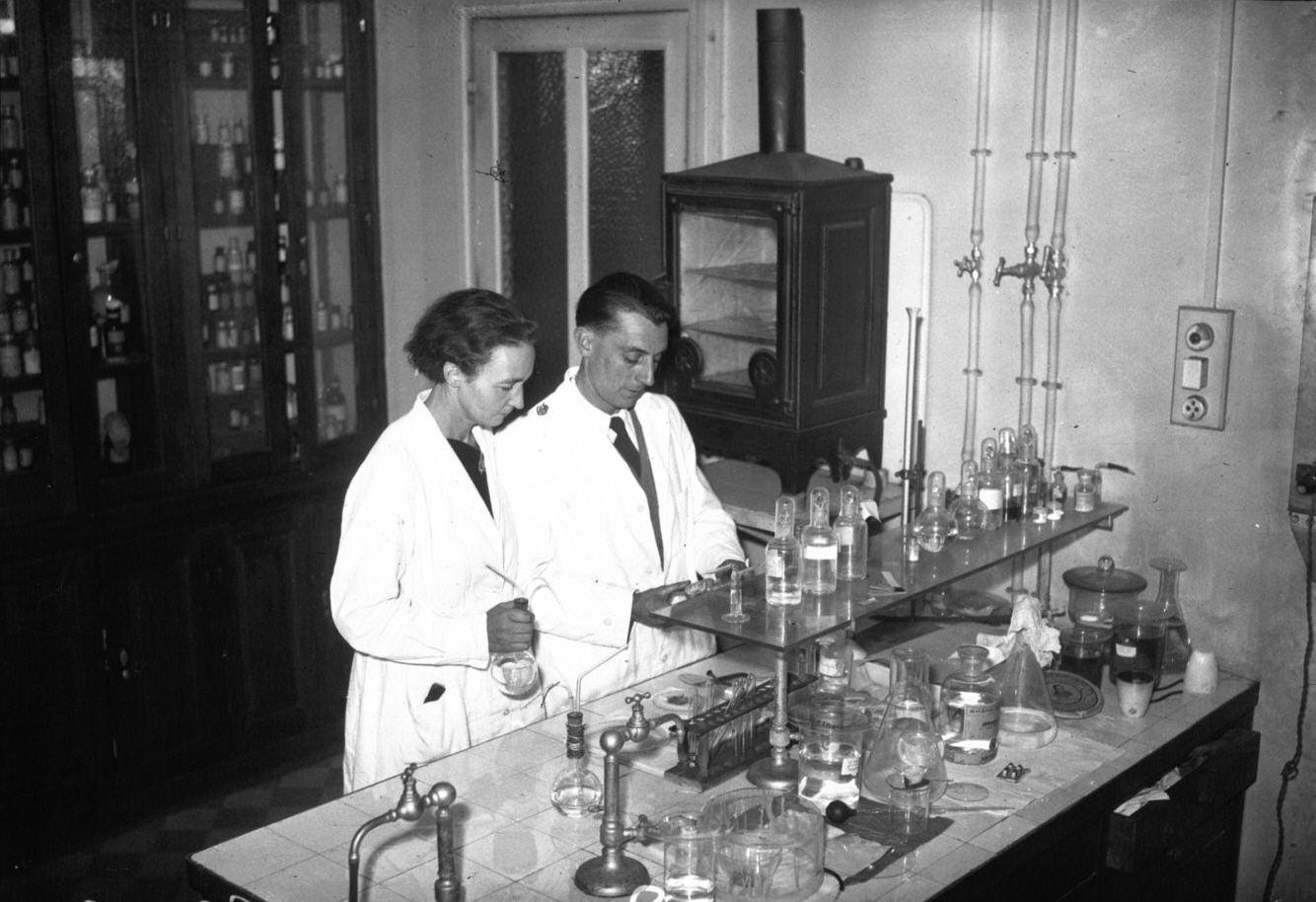
Irène and Frederic Joliot-Curie in 1935

==== Nuclear fission contributions: 1938–1955 ====
In 1938, Irène's laboratory research into radium nuclei helped another group of physicists, ultimately allowing a Nobel prize to be awarded to Otto Hahn. As the international scientific community tried to understand what happened when uranium was bombarded with neutrons, Irène read about experiments conducted by Meitner and Hahn, disagreed with them, and decided to conduct her own research. Working with the physicist Paul Savitch, she determined that bombarding uranium with neutrons created a lighter element strongly resembling lanthanum. They stopped short of declaring it lanthanum, as the widely held assumption was that uranium atoms were too heavy for this kind of transformation. As Meitner and Hahn were skeptical of this result, Irène repeated her research, publishing exactly the same results. The German chemist Fritz Strassmann urged Hahn to take Irène's work seriously, and when they repeated their own experiments using Irène's methods, they finally saw what she had seen. Hahn and Strassmann asked Meitner to help explain the mysterious results, and Meitner determined that the uranium had split in two, allowing for the presence of lighter atoms. Hahn ended up receiving a Nobel Prize for the discovery of nuclear fission. When Irène realized how close she had come to fully discovering fission herself, she and Frédéric expressed regret that they had not worked jointly on the experiments. Their former closer research partnership would perhaps have untangled the problem the same way as Meitner, Hahn and Strassmann.

During World War II, Irène's poor health and the German occupation of France meant that her research abilities were hindered. Frédéric had arranged for their supplies of uranium and heavy water to be removed from Paris and hidden safely elsewhere, an operation that was fortunately completed before Nazi authorities searched his laboratory at the Collège de France in 1940. French citizens in occupied parts of France were forced to obtain special permission from authorities to travel anywhere, so Irène made up a story about needing to collect forgotten lab equipment to travel to Bordeaux to retrieve and secure her mother's leftover supply of radium.

Frédéric engaged in secret work for the French Resistance during the war. Although he made plans to help Irène and their children escape to safety in another country, Irène was firm that they would not leave until Hélène had finished final exams for her baccalaureate degree. After the exam was held in a small village in secret, Irène and both children crossed into Switzerland on foot via the Jura Mountains on 6 June 1944. Their journey had the good fortune of coinciding with the date of the D Day invasion, meaning that German soldiers were preoccupied elsewhere that day and did not have as much security along the Swiss border. Just a few months later, they were able to return after the liberation of France.

Beginning in 1946, Irène shifted her attention to studying isotopes in relation to mineral dating and radioactivity measurements. Through the observation of alpha particle tracks in photographic emulsions, she developed a new method to identify and measure tiny amounts of uranium and thorium in rocks. She published a book about natural radioelements that she had begun working on during the war, and through her position as chair of general physics and radioactivity at the Sorbonne, she contributed to the training of young researchers such as Georges Charpak and Pierre Radvanyi.

The Joliot-Curies were both active in helping establish the Commissariat à l'énergie atomique (CEA), the French Atomic Energy Commission. In late 1945, Irène was appointed as a CEA commissioner, while her husband was its high commissioner. Irène was charged with sourcing uranium supplies to fuel a planned nuclear reactor, and she achieved this by training 300 uranium prospectors to scour the country for deposits of pitchblende. In 1948, using work on nuclear fission, the Joliot-Curies, along with other scientists, created the first French nuclear reactor. The reactor, Zoé (Zéro énergie Oxyde et Eau lourde) generated five kilowatts of power, initiating nuclear energy as a new source of electric power in France. In 1949 Irène officially became director of her mother's Institut Curie which she had supported for many years. When her term as CEA commissioner ended in 1951, it was not renewed. Frédéric's close affiliation with Communist groups, unpopular during the during the Cold War era, had led to his being fired from the CEA in 1950, and Irène's close association with him meant that she faced a similar drop in political favour.

By the mid-1950s, years of working so closely with radioactive materials finally caught up with Joliot-Curie, and she was diagnosed with leukemia. She continued working in the lab right up until a few weeks before her death in early 1956, when her condition deteriorated suddenly. In 1955, she had begun her last major scientific project: the development of new physics laboratories at the Orsay Faculty of Sciences, which would be completed by her husband after her death.

=== Political views ===
==== Anti-fascism, socialism, and communism ====
The Joliot-Curies were increasingly aware of the growth of the fascist movement during the 1930s and opposed it. Frédéric joined the Socialist Party in 1934, and both he and Irène joined the Comité de vigilance des intellectuels antifascistes a year later. In 1936 they actively supported the Republican faction in the Spanish Civil War. While Irène sympathized with socialist and communist movements – which both had a strong history of supporting feminism in Europe – she felt that her responsibility to the Curie family name meant that she could not declare allegiance to any single political party.

The Joliot-Curies had continued Pierre and Marie's policy of publishing all their work for the benefit of the global scientific community; however, afraid of the danger that might result should it be developed for military use as Nazi Germany gained power in the late 1930s, they discontinued doing so. On 30 October 1939, they entrusted their entire documented research on nuclear fission to the safekeeping of the French Academy of Sciences, where it remained until 1949.

For the 220th anniversary of the Russian Academy of Science, Frédéric and Irène visited Moscow. On their return, they sympathized with their Russian colleagues. Frédéric maintained a close connection with the Communist Party. As a result of his political views, Irène was later detained on Ellis Island during a trip to the United States. She had been invited by the Joint Antifascist Refugee Committee to speak in support of refugees from Spain. In 1953, Irène applied for membership in the American Chemical Society but was denied. While the society provided no explanation for her rejection, it was believed by members of the scientific community that American anti-Communist sentiment was responsible. The Bulletin of Atomic Scientists published a statement of support for Irène the following year, denouncing the society's decision and expressing concern that this refusal to admit her would harm the American scientific community's standing abroad.

==== Feminism ====
Irène was a passionate member of the feminist movement, especially in regard to science. She continually applied to the French Academy of Sciences, an elite scientific organization, knowing that she would be denied membership. She did so to draw attention to the fact they did not accept women. She was involved in many speaking functions, such as International Women's Day conferences in Europe. An active promoter of women's education, she served on the National Committee of the Union of French Women (Comité National de l'Union des Femmes Françaises).

In 1936, Irène, Cécile Brunschvicg and Suzanne Lacore became the first three women to be appointed French ministers by the French prime minister Léon Blum who belonged to the Popular front. Irène was appointed undersecretary of state for scientific research, in which capacity she helped to found the French National Centre for Scientific Research (CNRS). Although she was not particularly keen on a political posting, she accepted the job as "a sacrifice for the feminist cause in France" to support women's rights and set an example. She arranged beforehand that she would remain in the position for three months, and then resigned to continue her scientific research.

==== Post-World War II advocacy ====
Irène Joliot-Curie's political advocacy continued after the war. Together with her sister Ève, in 1946 she attended the trial of the Spanish chemist María Teresa Toral who was accused by Franco of supporting the Republicans. Thanks to their support, her sentence was set at two years imprisonment rather the death sentence or a 30-year prison sentence originally called for. In 1948, during a long strike involving coal miners, French newspapers called on families to assist the strikers by temporarily adopting the children of coal miners until the strike was over. The Joliot-Curies responded by adopting and caring for two young girls.

Irène Joliot-Curie was a member of the World Peace Council. She advocated for peace and played a major role for the French contingent at the 1948 World Congress of Intellectuals for Peace, which promoted the World Peace movement, and in 1950 she added her signature to the Stockholm Appeal in protest against the use of atomic bombs.

=== Personal life ===
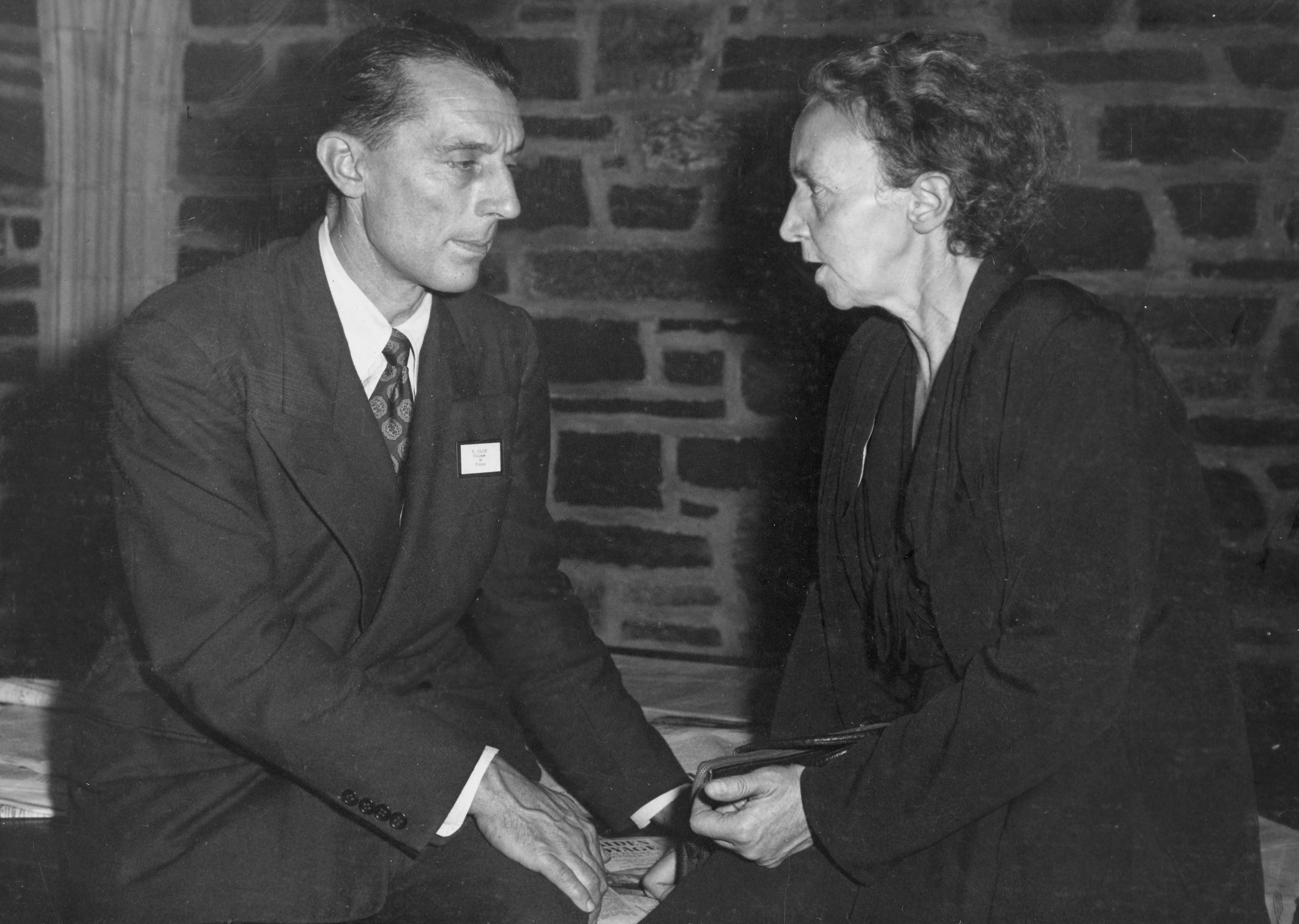
The Joliot-Curies in the 1940s

Accompanying her mother, sister and husband, Irène spent several summers in Brittany at L'Arcouest near Ploubazlanec, a resort which attracted scientists who discussed the issues of the times. As a result, in the 1930s, it became known as "Sorbonne plage" (Sorbonne Beach). The Joliot-Curie couple were also keen on sports. Together with their colleagues, they took part in everything from swimming to hiking, tennis and gymnastics.

After their marriage, Irène and Frédéric used variations of their surnames for different purposes. For social events, they both used "Joliot", but when Irène signed her scientific papers she continued to sign them as "Irène Curie". When publishing political statements or popular articles, the couple went by "Joliot-Curie". While Frédéric sometimes fretted about which name to use, Irène was largely indifferent to the question and was comfortable with both surnames. They had two children, Hélène, born in 1927, and Pierre, born in 1932.

=== Death and legacy ===
Irène Joliot-Curie's gravestone in the cemetery at Sceaux, Hauts-de-Seine

In February 1956, during a brief visit to the family's ski chalet in the French Alps, Joliot-Curie began feeling severely ill and returned to Paris, where she was admitted into the hospital at the Radium Institute. She was given a diagnosis of leukemia, a cancer largely suspected to have developed from her years working directly with X-rays and radioactive substances. She died on 17 March 1956 at the age of 58. Frédéric's health was also declining, and he died in 1958 from liver disease, which too was said to be the result of overexposure to radiation.

Joliot-Curie had been non-religious and deeply committed to peace movements. When the French government arranged for a national funeral to be held in her honour, Irène's family therefore asked for the exclusion of religious and military content.

The Joliot-Curies' discovery of induced radioactivity led to significant new applications of radiochemistry in medicine and science: researchers were now able to create and use radioisotopes in their work, and radiopharmaceuticals became part of diagnosis and treatment procedures for cancer. In geology, induced radioactivity led to new methods of examining density and makeup of minerals in drilled wells. Joliot-Curie's daughter, Hélène Langevin-Joliot, went on to become a nuclear physicist and professor at the University of Paris. Joliot-Curie's son, Pierre Joliot, became a biophysicist with a focus on the study of photosynthesis.

== Honours and awards ==
=== Nobel Prize ===
Irène Joliot-Curie received the 1935 Nobel Prize in Chemistry together with her husband, Frédéric Joliot-Curie, for their discovery of induced radioactivity. They were the second married couple, after her parents, to win the prize, adding to the Curie family's unbeaten legacy of four Nobel Prizes shared among five individuals. (In addition to the three prizes in physics and chemistry held by the Curies and Joliot-Curies, Ève Curie's husband Henry Labouisse went on to receive a Nobel Peace Prize.) As of 2026, she and her mother Marie Curie form the only mother–daughter pair to become Nobel laureates, while Pierre and Irène Curie are the only father-daughter pair to have won Nobel Prizes, compared to seven father-son pairs.

=== Other honours ===
Irène Curie received the French Médaille militaire (military medal) in 1918 for her work with radiography in World War I. She was honoured as an Officer of the French Legion of Honour in 1939. In the early 1950s, she received honorary degrees from the University of Marie Curie-Skłodowska and Jagiellonian University. While never admitted to the French Academy of Sciences, she was granted membership of scientific academies in several other countries, including the Polish Academy of Sciences.

In 1932, she and Frédéric Joliot-Curie were jointly awarded the Italian Matteucci Medal for physicists. In 1940, they both received the Barnard Medal for Meritorious Service to Science, and in 1954 they were awarded the Lavoisier Gold Medal from the French Academy of Sciences.

The Prix Joliot-Curie, an annual award recognizing achievements in nuclear physics and particle physics, was named in Irène's honour by the Société Française de Physique in 1956. The French government also launched the Irène Joliot-Curie Prize, which recognizes women in science, in 2001.

Irène Joliot-Curie's name is included on the Monument to the X-ray and Radium Martyrs of All Nations erected in Hamburg, Germany. In 2026, she was announced as one of the 72 historical women in STEM whose names were proposed to be added to the 72 men already celebrated on the Eiffel Tower. Her mother was also on the list. The plan was announced by the mayor of Paris, Anne Hidalgo, following the recommendations of a committee led by Isabelle Vauglin of Femmes & Sciences and Jean-François Martins, representing the operating company which runs the Eiffel Tower.

== Selected publications ==
The following list presents the papers Irène published on research conduced with her husband as well as some based on her independent research:

- Curie, I. (1925) Primary thesis: Recherches sur les rayons α du polonium. Oscillation de parcours, vitesse d'émission, pouvoir ionisant. Secondary thesis suggested by the university: La sursaturation des vapeurs
- Joliot-Curie, I.; Joliot-Curie, J.F. (1932) La projection de noyaux atomiques par un rayonnement très pénétrant
- Joliot-Curie, I.; Joliot-Curie, J.F. (1934) L'électron positif
- Joliot-Curie, J.F.; Joliot-Curie, I. (1935) Radioactivité artificielle
- Joliot.Curie, I.; Walen, R.J; Grégoire, R.; Grinberg, B.; Pontekorvo, B.M. (1938) Physique nucléaire, radioactivité naturelle, transmutations, radioactivité artificielle, neutrons
- Joliot-Curie, I. (1945) Les Radioéléments naturels, propriétés chimiques, préparation, dosage
- Joliot-Curie, I. (1956) Les Progrès récents en radioactivité et en physique nucléaire
- Joliot-Curie, I.; Farage, H. (1955) Autoradiographie par neutrons, dosage séparé de l'uranium et du thorium dans les minéraux
- Joliot-Cuire, J.F.; Joliot-Curie, I. (1961) Oeuvres scientifiques complètes

In 1954, on the occasion of the 20th anniversary of her mother's death, Joliot-Curie documented her memories and impressions of her mother for publication in the journal Europe. In 2022 this text was republished and released as a book:

- Joliot-Curie, Irène. (2022) Marie Curie, ma mère

== See also ==
- List of female Nobel laureates
- List of women associated with Marie Curie and Irène Joliot-Curie
- Stefania Maracineanu
- Radioactive (film)
- Timeline of women in science
- Women in chemistry
