= Hélène Langevin-Joliot =

French physicist (born 1927)

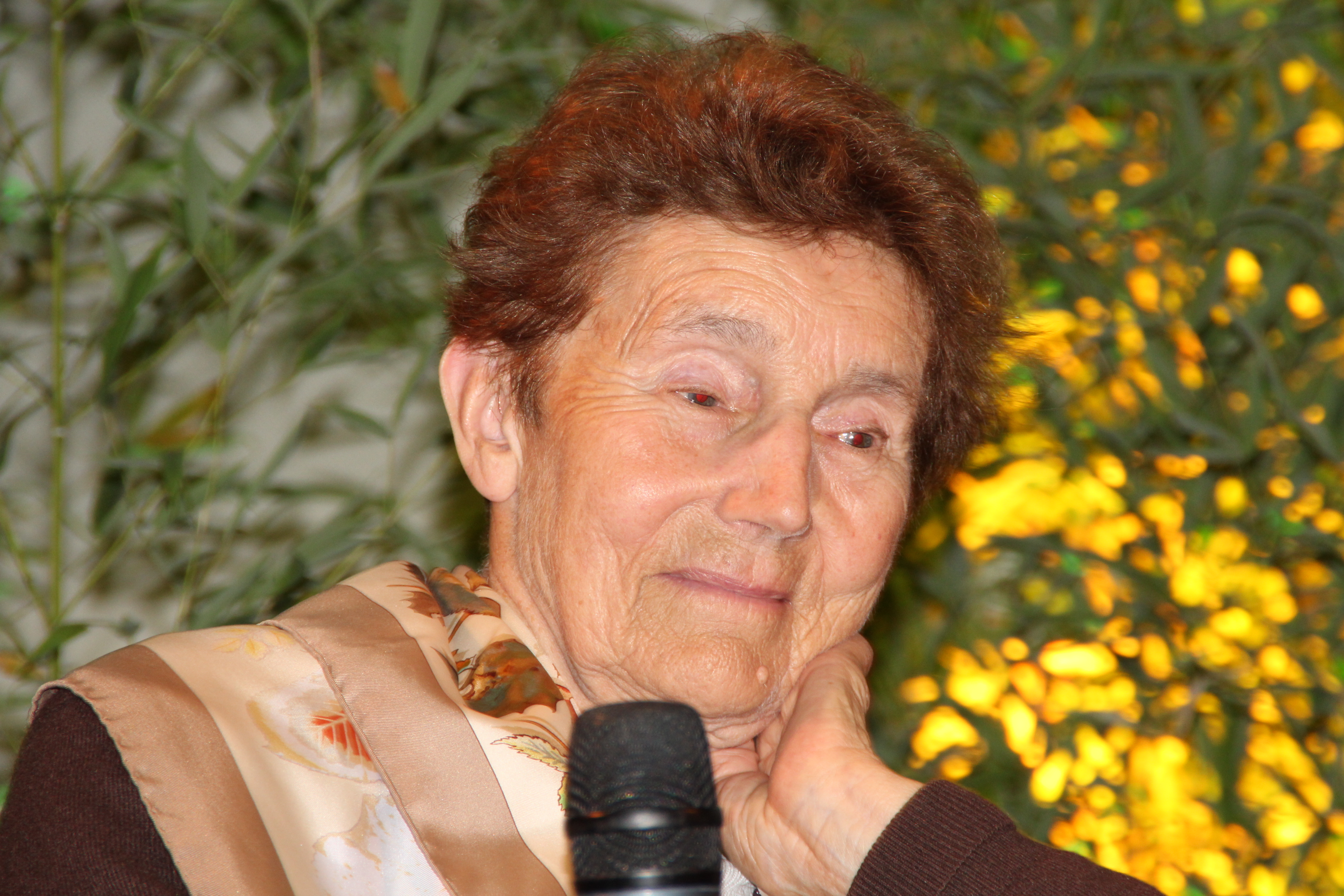
- Langevin-Joliot in 2012
- Born: Hélène Joliot-Curie; 19 September 1927 (age 99); Nice, France
- Spouse: Michel Langevin
- Children: Yves Langevin, Françoise Langevin-Mijangos
- Relatives: Irène Joliot-Curie (mother); Frédéric Joliot-Curie (father); Marie Skłodowska-Curie (grandmother); Pierre Curie (grandfather); Ève Curie (aunt); Józef Skłodowski (great uncle); Bronisława Dłuska (great aunt); Helena Skłodowska-Szalay (great aunt)
- Scientific career
- Fields: Physics
- Workplaces: CNRS
- Thesis: Contribution à l'étude des phénomènes de freinage interne et d'autoionisation associés à la désintégration β. (1956)

Hélène Langevin-Joliot (French: [elɛn lɑ̃ʒəvɛ̃ ʒɔljo]; née Joliot-Curie; born 19 September 1927) is a French nuclear physicist known for her research on nuclear reactions in French laboratories and for being the granddaughter of Marie Skłodowska-Curie and Pierre Curie and the daughter of Irène Joliot-Curie and Frédéric Joliot-Curie, all four of whom have received Nobel Prizes, in Physics (Pierre and Marie Curie) or Chemistry (Marie Curie and the Joliot-Curies). Since retiring from a career in research Hélène has participated in activism centered around encouraging women and girls to participate in STEM fields. Her activism also revolves around promoting greater science literacy for the general public.

== Early life and education ==
Hélène Langevin-Joliot was born in Paris, France, on September 19, 1927. She developed a passion for science in her early life, seeing her parents Jean Frédéric Joliot-Curie and Irène Joliot-Curie win a Nobel Prize for Chemistry in 1935. She was particularly skilled in math as a child and young adult, so her parents pushed her towards physics which is the field she pursued educationally and professionally moving forward. As a teen, she studied at the École Nationale de Chimie Physique et Biologie de Paris where she excelled academically. She was later educated at the IN2P3 (English: Institute of Nuclear Physics and Particle Physics) at Orsay, a laboratory which was set up by her parents Irène Joliot-Curie and Frédéric Joliot-Curie. After receiving her bachelor's degree, she began work on a doctorate in nuclear physics. She focused on auto ionization and internal Bremsstrahlung phenomena and went on to receive her doctorate in nuclear physics on this topic from the Collège de France.

== Career ==
After receiving her doctorate, Langevin-Joliot went on to work for the CNRS as a researcher in 1949, mainly focusing on nuclear reactions. She eventually become the director of research at this institute in 1969 and continued to do research for CNRS until she retired in 1992. Upon her retirement, she was given the title of Director of Research emeritus at CNRS for her research work there and her work as the Director of Research. During her professional career she also did research for the Laboratory of Chemistry and Nuclear Physics at the Collège de France beginning in 1949 and leaving the organization in 1957. From there she went work on to work nuclear reactions for the Institut national de physique nucléaire et de physique des particules, eventually leaving in 2008. Towards the end of her professional career, she worked for the French government's advisory committee. She also worked for the French government as a member of the Scientific Advisory Group of the Parliamentary Office of Scientific and Technological Options between 1985 and 1992 and as a member of the Commission for the Centennial Celebration of the Discovery of Radioactivity and Radio between 1996 and 1998. She is a professor of nuclear physics at the Institute of Nuclear Physics at the University of Paris and a director of research at the CNRS. She is also known for her work in actively encouraging women to pursue careers in scientific fields. She is chairperson of the panel that awards the Marie Curie Excellence award, a prize given to outstanding European researchers. She was president of the French Rationalist Union from 2004 to 2012. In this position Langevin-Joliot participated in activism centered on science and technology by giving talks and presentation as well as writing articles for the Rationalist Union's reviews.

== Activism ==
Hélène Langevin-Joliot is also known for her work in encouraging women to join STEM fields through interviews and stories she tells of her mother and grandmother. She is encouraged by the increasing number of women within scientific fields and hopes more girls feel inspired by her family to pursue their passions in science. She has also done work in encouraging science literacy through her interviews and talks about her career and the career of her family. She has also written extensively on her family and their contributions to the field of physics and science as a whole since she does not agree with the commonly held belief that Marie Curie sacrificed her life for science. In her association with the Association for Scientific Culture and the Promotion of Reason and Science (Rationalist Union) she advocates for peaceful use of nuclear and atomic energy through writings in Raison Présente, their quarterly review.

== Family ==
Langevin-Joliot comes from a family of well-known scientists.

- Her maternal grandparents were Marie and Pierre Curie, famous for their study of radioactivity, for which they won a Nobel Prize in physics with Henri Becquerel in 1903. Marie Curie was the first person to win Nobel Prizes in two different sciences (Linus Pauling was the second to do so); her second was awarded in chemistry in (1911) for her discoveries of radium and polonium.
- Her parents, Frédéric Joliot-Curie (born Jean Frédéric Joliot) (who was mentored by Marie) and Irène Joliot-Curie (born Irène Curie), won a Nobel Prize for chemistry in 1935 for their discovery of Induced radioactivity.
- Her brother Pierre Joliot is a noted biophysicist who has made contributions to the study of photosynthesis.

In response to her family's legacy, Langevin-Joliot regularly grants interviews and gives talks about their history. Her knowledge of her family's history led to her writing the introduction to Radiation and Modern Life: Fulfilling Marie Curie's Dream, including a brief history of the Curies.

Her husband, Michel Langevin, was grandson of the famous physicist Paul Langevin (who had a relationship with the widowed Marie Curie, Hélène's grandmother, in 1910) and was also a nuclear physicist at the institute; her son, Yves (b. 1951), is an astrophysicist.

== Selected works ==
=== Academic ===
- "Sur un rayonnement γ de 121 keV obseryé dans une source de 147Pm de très grande pureté". Journal de Physique et le Radium 17, no. 6 (1956): 497-498. https://doi.org/10.1051/jphysrad:01956001706049700.
- "Contribution à l’étude des phénomènes de freinage interne et d’autoionisation associés à la désintégration β". Annales de Physique. Vol. 13. No. 2. 1957. https://doi.org/10.1051/anphys/195713020016.
- "Marie Curie and Her Time". Chemistry International 33.1 (2011): 4.

=== Literary ===
- "Radiation And Modern Life: Fulfilling Marie Curie's Dream". 2004.
- "Marie Curie et ses filles. Lettres". 2011.
- "L'épopée de l'énergie nucléaire: Une histoire scientifique et industrielle". 2013.
- "Science et culture: Repères pour une culture scientifique commune". 2020.
- "Marie Curie, ma mère". 2022.

=== Articles ===
- "Progrès scientifique et progrès : pour sortir de la confusion", Raison présente, vol. 194, no. 2, 2015, pp. 19-29.
