= Zoé (reactor) =

First French atomic reactor

Coordinates: 48.7906°N 2.2761°E

The Zoé reactor, or EL-1, was the first French atomic reactor. It was built in 1947 at the Fort de Châtillon in Fontenay-aux-Roses, a suburb of Paris.

Design work for the heavy-water reactor was started in 1947 by Frédéric Joliot-Curie, who was at the time director of the French Commission for Atomic Energy (French: Commissariat à l'énergie atomique) or CEA. The project manager was Lew Kowarski, who had just returned from Canada, where he had supervised the construction of the Canadian ZEEP heavy-water reactor. Zoé was activated on 15 December 1948, reaching a power of 150 kW by 1953. The nuclear fuel was provided by Bouchet of Ballancourt-sur-Essonne, which reprocessed the irradiated fuel and extracted the first milligrams of French-produced plutonium. The reactor was shut down in March 1976 and containment of the reactor was completed in 1977.

The choice of moderator and fuel was dictated by the undeveloped state of the French nuclear industry at the time, which could not manufacture the corrosion-proof equipment needed for a more advanced unit. The reactor was a pool-type design, with five tons of heavy water moderator surrounded by a two-meter-thick concrete wall. The core, immersed in the pool, consisted of 60 aluminum-cased vertical rods containing three tons of uranium oxide pellets, controlled by cadmium rods. The heavy water was purchased from Norsk Hydro. A cooling system was added after the reactor had operated for a time, allowing it to run at a heat release rate of 200 kilowatts.

The name Zoé was an acronym, from Zéro de puissance (zero power, that is, very little capacity to produce electricity, which made it easier and faster to build); Oxyde d'uranium (uranium oxide), Eau lourde (heavy water). The Châtillon site was superseded for later nuclear research by a new site at Saclay. The reactor was also known as EL-1 (Eau Lourde); its successor at Saclay was EL-2.

The building that formerly housed Zoé is now an exhibit space, the Museum of the Atom.

== Bibliography ==
- Pinault, Michel, Frédéric Joliot-Curie, Editions Odile Jacob, Paris, 2000. (ISBN 2-7381-0812-1)
