= École nationale de chimie physique et biologie de Paris =

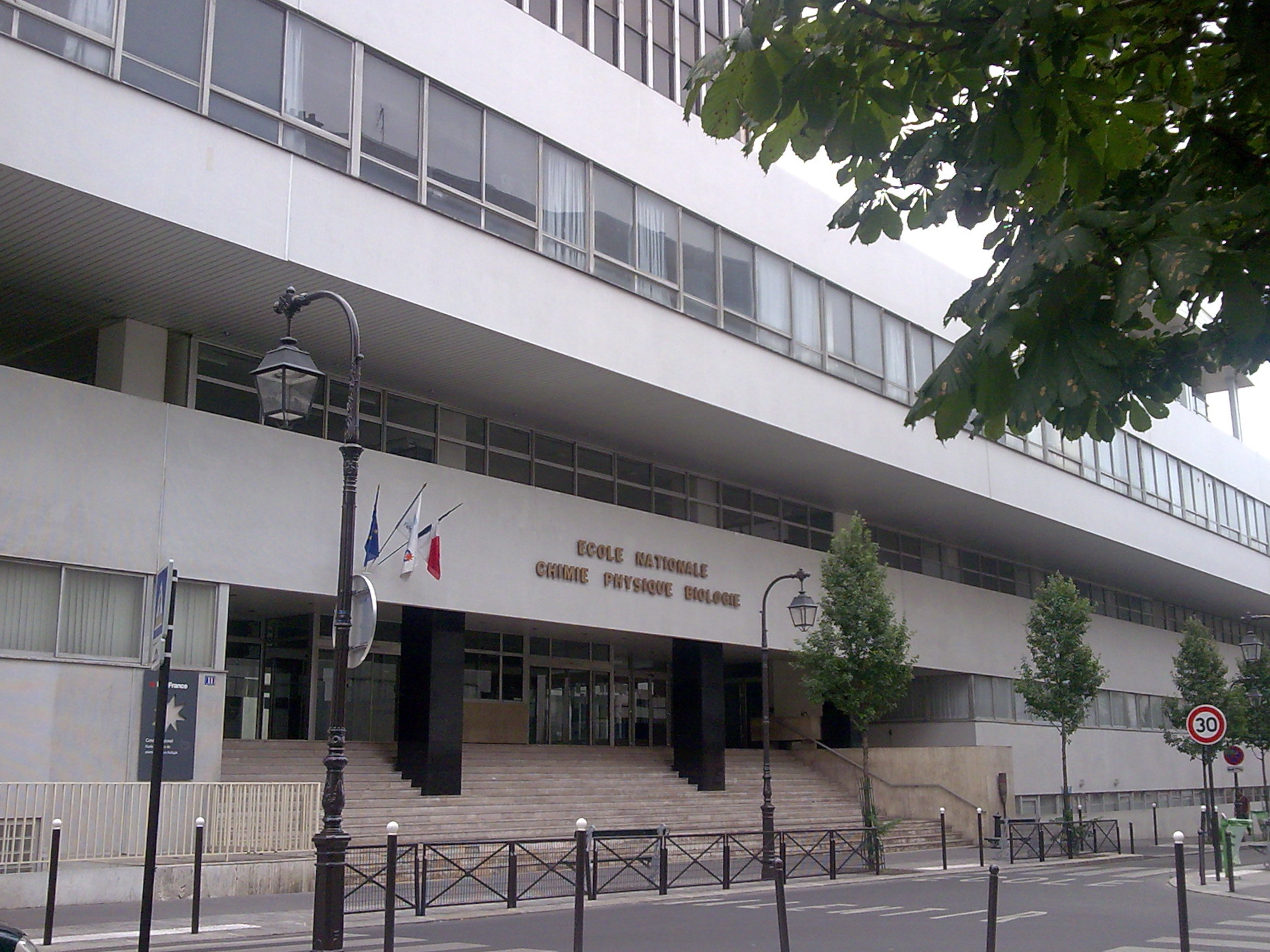
- Entrance to the lycée, rue Pirandello

Location
- 11, rue Pirandello, Paris; France
- Coordinates: 48.836523°N 2.356165°E

Information
- Established: 1953

The École nationale de chimie physique et biologie de Paris (ENCPB), renamed in 2009 "lycée Pierre-Gilles-de-Gennes - ENCPB" after physicist Pierre-Gilles de Gennes died in 2007, is a public secondary and higher school specialising in technical and scientific subjects and preparatory classes to the grandes écoles (CPGE). It is located at 11 rue Pirandello in the 13th arrondissement of Paris.

== History and courses ==
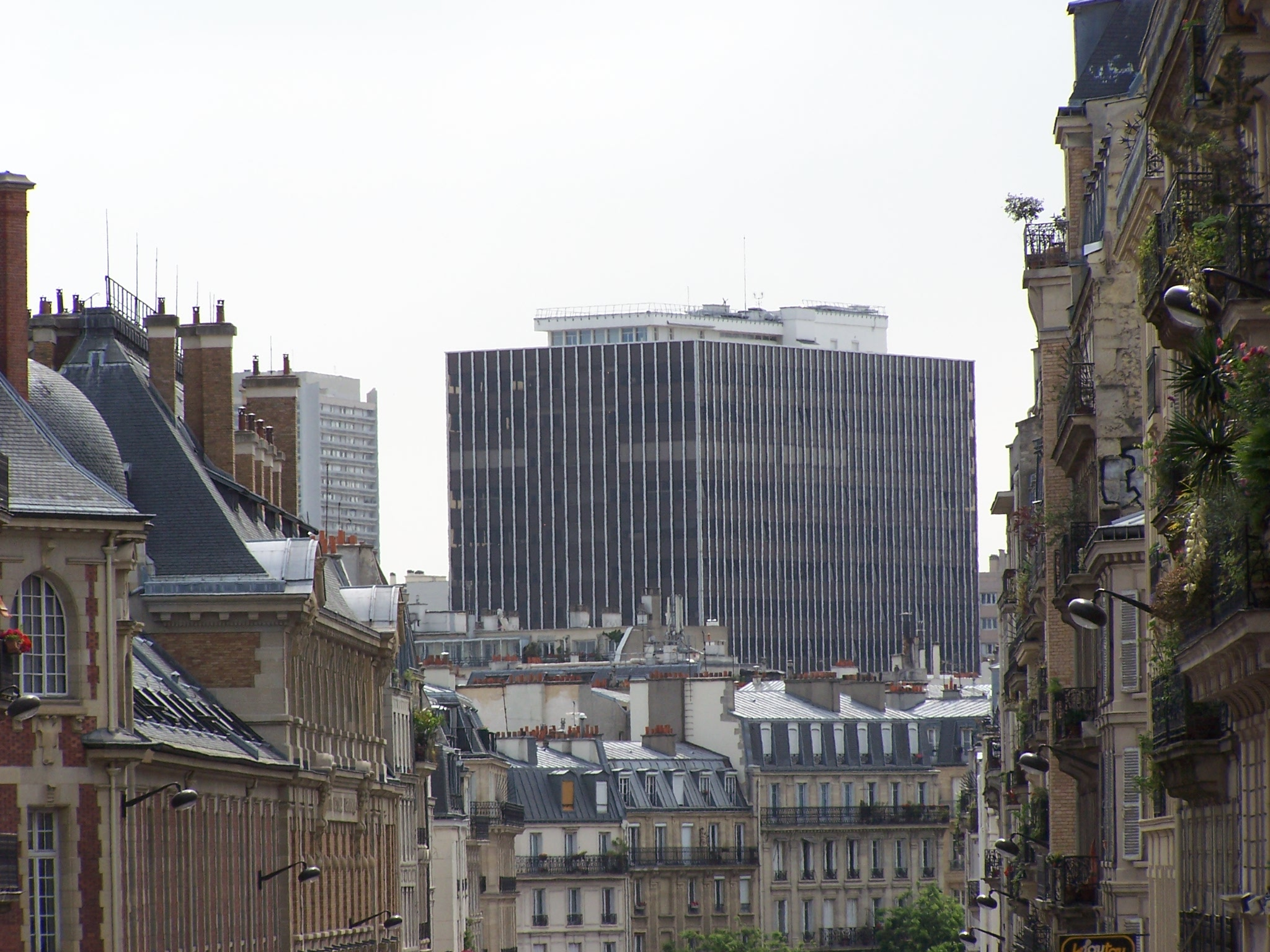
Distant view of the main building from rue Claude-Bernard.

With a desire to create a public institution for the training of lab technicians at baccalauréat level and higher technicians following the growth in sciences in the post-war period, the state created the ENCPB in 1953. The school took its first 50 students in 1955 at a site on rue Corvisart in the 13th arrondissement of Paris. The first move for the school was to rue du Banquier in 1958. From 1961 to 1971, the ENCPB joined with a number of technician training institutions, including the Institut d'Arsonval (8, rue Rollin in Paris 5th), the research centre for l'Oréal (Avenue Gabriel Péri at La Courneuve) and a school in Dijon.

With the construction from 1970 to 1973 of a new location on rue Pirandello on the former site of the Delahaye automobiles factory (1898–1954), the ENCPB diversified its courses with the creation of classes préparatoires aux grandes écoles in the sections of MP, PC, BCPST and TB.

=== Lycée rankings ===
In 2016, the lycée was ranked 81st out of 110 at départemental level in terms of teaching quality, and 1205th at national level. The ranking is based on three criteria: the bac results, the proportion of students who obtain their baccalauréat after spending their last two years at the establishment, and the added value (calculated based on the social origin of the students, their age, and their national diploma results).

=== CPGE rankings ===
The national rankings for preparatory classes to the grandes écoles (CPGE) are the admission rates for students to the most reputable French grandes écoles.

In 2015, the magazine L'Étudiant gave the following rankings for 2014 :

Stream	Students admitted to a grande école^{*}	Admission rate^{*}	Average rate over 5 years	National ranking	Year-on-year comparison
MP / MP*	0 / 31 students	0%	1%	114thex-æquo out of 114	▼65
PC / PC*	0 / 39 students	0%	0%	110thex-æquo out of 110	=
PSI / PSI*	1 / 49 students	2%	1%	82ndex-æquo out of 120	▲38
BCPST	2 / 29 students	7%	25%	52nd out of 53	▼17
Source : Classement 2015 des prépas - L'Étudiant (Concours de 2014). * the admission rate depends upon the grandes écoles included in the study. In the scientific stream, this was a group of 11-17 engineering schools which were selected by L'Étudiant for the streams (MP, PC, PSI, PT or BCPST).

In 1984, the ENCPB adopted the reforms to higher education, and offered a national diploma of Brevet de technicien supérieur (BTS), creating sections for:

- Chemistry
- Physics
- Medical biology analysis (formerly BTS biological analysis)
- Bioanalysis and control (formerly BTS Biochemistry before 2005)
- Biotechnology
- Quality in the food and bio-industries
- Water studies

The also offered technological baccalauréats (as they are now known):

- STL physics
- STL chemistry
- STL control regulation
- STL biochemistry and biological engineering

They also offered post-BTS courses from 1984 to 2007, which became "professional licences":

- Functional genomics
- Biomedical instrumentation and maintenance
- Hospital hygiene (training for biohygienists)
- Double competence in chemistry regulation
- Organic synthesis
- Formulation
- Medical imaging and therapeutic radiology was added to the existing BTS, before in 2012, with health reforms, becoming a diploma at bac+3

The ENCPB have developed partnerships with the École normale supérieure de Cachan and the Université Paris VII allowing students to study at these institutions, but also with a training centre for technical teachers for the Kingdom of Morocco in chemical engineering. The ENCPB actively takes part in European programmes (Erasmus, Comett...).

After the death in 2007 of physician Pierre-Gilles de Gennes, Nobel Prize in Physics laureate, the ENCPB was renamed "lycée Pierre-Gilles-de-Gennes - ENCPB" after him, and became a general and technological lycée with the development of a general S (SVT and SI) stream parallel to the lab technology stream.

== Distribution ==
Currently, the ENCPB has 1920 students in four study cycles:

- 31% in general scientific and technological baccalauréats
- 20% in preparatory classes for grandes écoles
- 45% in BTS
- 4% in post-BTS

== Filming location ==
During the construction of the new ENCPB building, the filming of Juliette et Juliette (released in 1974) took place on site. This was particularly due to the proximity of two cafés, located face to face on the corner of a block. This configuration exactly met the needs of the film (one of the cafés was turned into a restaurant during the filming).

More recently, the entrance to the ENCPB was used for the décor of the film Caché (2005) by Michael Haneke, particularly in the final scene, where the key to understanding the film takes place. In 2010, the school was used for scenes in the telefilm Obsessions by Frédéric Tellier where the laboratories stand in for "Laboratoire de la police scientifique".

== Alumni ==
- Didier Baichère

== Access ==
The ENCPB is served by the Metro lines 5 at the station Campo-Formio and 7 at the station Les Gobelins, as well as the Bus (RATP) lines:

- RATP bus routes from 20 to 99#Ligne 27 stop Banquier
- RATP bus routes from 20 to 99#Ligne 57 stop Jenner - Jeanne d'Arc
- RATP bus routes from 20 to 99#Ligne 91 stop Saint-Marcel - Jeanne d'Arc
