= Jacques Curie =

French physicist (1855–1941)

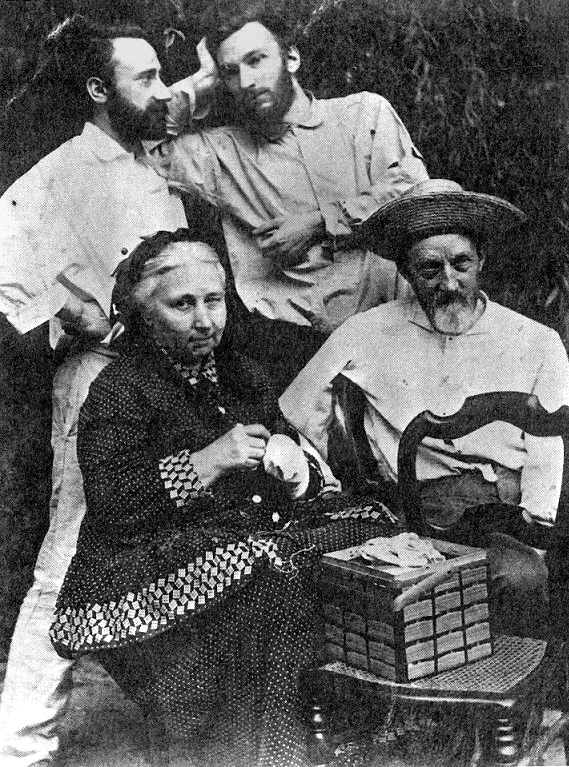
Jacques (1855–1941, left) with his brother Pierre (1859–1906) and his parents Eugène Curie (1827–1910) and Sophie-Claire Depouilly (1832–1897)

Jacques Curie (29 October 1855 – 19 February 1941) was a French physicist and professor of mineralogy at the University of Montpellier. Along with his younger brother, Pierre Curie, he studied pyroelectricity in the 1880s, leading to their discovery of some of the mechanisms behind piezoelectricity.

He is buried in the Saint-Lazare cemetery in Montpellier.

== Biography ==
In 1883, Jacques Curie was appointed professor of mineralogy at the University of Montpellier. This appointment marked the end of his collaboration with his brother Pierre. He remained in Montpellier until his death in 1941 with the exception of the years 1887–1889, which he spent in Algeria, teaching at the School of Science of Algiers and conducting his research. It was not until 1903 that he was appointed to the chair of physics, a position he retained until his retirement in 1925. His father, Eugène Curie, was an anti-clerical freethinker and did not have his sons, Jacques and Pierrie, baptized. His son Maurice Curie was a physicist.

== Research and discoveries ==
The major legacy of Jacques Curie is the discovery of the piezoelectric effect with his brother Pierre in 1880. The two brothers were then laboratory assistants at the Faculty of Sciences of Paris, under the direction of Charles Friedel. The accounts of their discovery generally give Jacques Curie only a minor role in favor of his brother Pierre. Doubtless the comparison between the latter's brilliant career and the more quiet one of Jacques gives some reason for this, however there is no evidence that Jacques was limited to a minor role: In particular he had more experience than his brother in the study of pyroelectricity. In fact it is almost impossible to clearly separate the contributions of the two brothers as they constantly shared their ideas. According to Shaul Katzir, one must consider the discovery as a joint contribution.

The Curie–von Schweidler law refers to the response of dielectric material to the step input of a direct current (DC) voltage first observed by Jacques Curie in 1889 and independently by Egon Ritter von Schweidler in 1907.

== See also ==
- Pierre Curie
- Marie Skłodowska–Curie
- Curie Family
