= Maurice Curie =

French physicist (1888–1975)

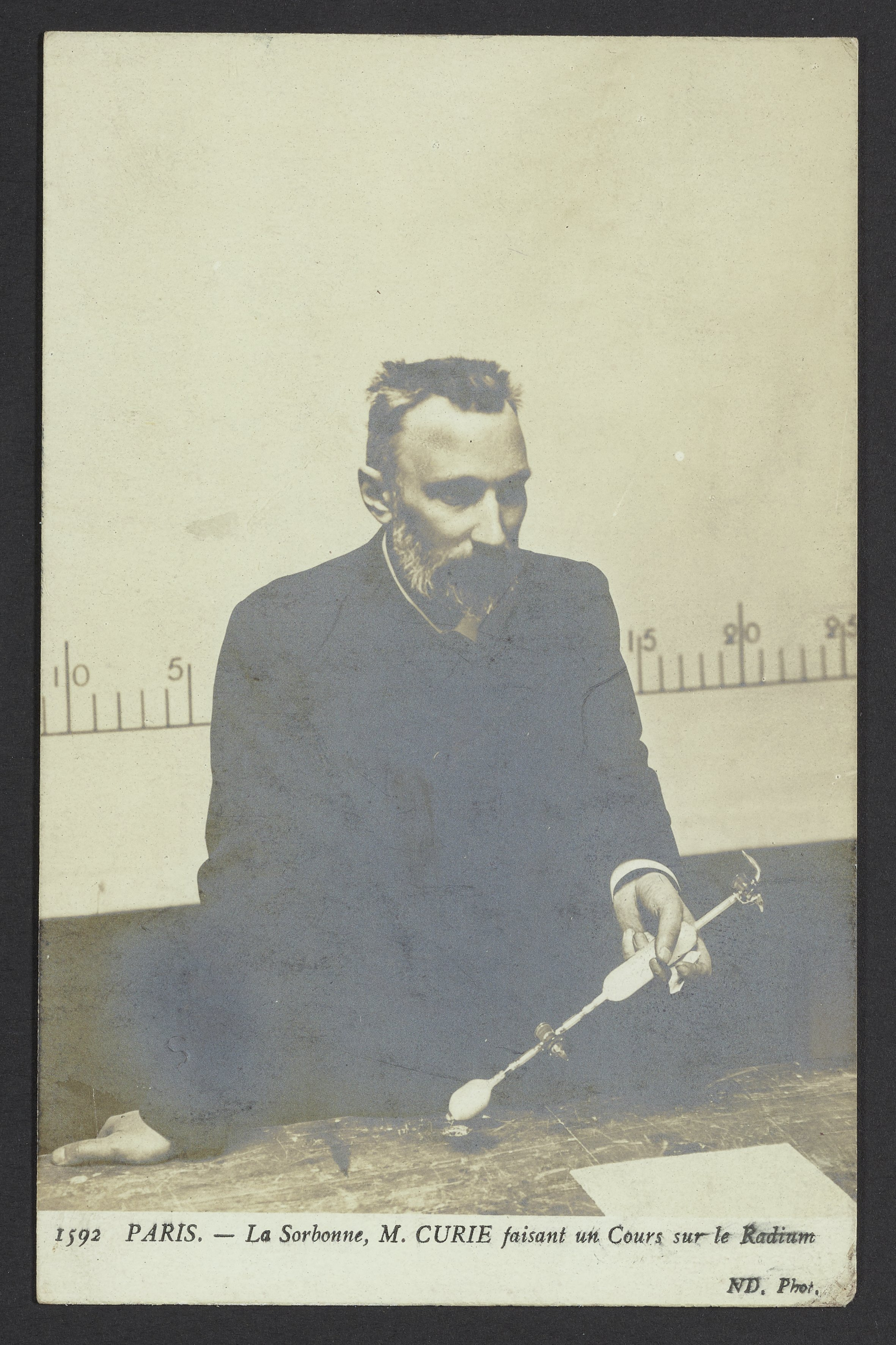
- Curie c. 1920s
- Born: October 12, 1888
- Died: September 2, 1975 (aged 86)
- Children: Daniel Curie
- Father: Jacques Curie
- Relatives: Pierre Curie (uncle)
- Scientific career
- Fields: Nuclear physics
- Institutions: Sorbonne; Curie Laboratory

Maurice Curie (October 12, 1888 – September 2, 1975) was a French physicist and professor of physics at the Sorbonne, at the Institute of Physico-Chemical Biology.

== Biography ==
Maurice was the son of Jacques Curie and the nephew of Pierre Curie.

He worked with Marie Curie in the Curie Laboratory from 1913–1914. He corresponded with her throughout the First World War, where he served twelve months at the front before 1917, mainly in the Verdun area.

He is the father of physicist Daniel Curie.

== Works ==
- Recherches sur la photoluminescence, Paris, Presses universitaires de France, 51 pages, 1923. - Thesis of the Faculty of Sciences of the University of Paris, PhD in Physical Sciences.
- Le radium et les radio-éléments, coll. "Mining and Metallurgical Encyclopedia", Corbeil, Crete, and Paris, JB Baillière, 354 pages, 1925, preface by Marie Curie.
- Luminescence des corps solides, Fontenay-aux-Roses, Presses universitaires de France, 147 pages, 1934.
- Nécessaire mathématique (with M. Prost), coll. "Scientific and Industrial News", No. 502, Saint-Amand, Bussière, and Paris, Hermann et Cie, 116 pages, 1937.
- Fluorescence et phosphorescence, Paris, Hermann, 212 pages, 1946.
- Physique, Paris, C. Hermant, s.d., 2 volumes, 522 pages; reed., 1953.
- Questions actuelles en luminescence cristalline (with Daniel Curie), Paris, Editions of the "Journal of theoretical and instrumental optics", 86 pages, 1956.
- Précis de physique, Paris, Presses universitaires de France, 2 volumes: volume 1, 342 pages, 1961; volume 2, 312 pages, 1962.
