= Frédéric Joliot-Curie =

French chemist and physicist (1900–1958)

Frédéric Joliot-Curie ForMemRS
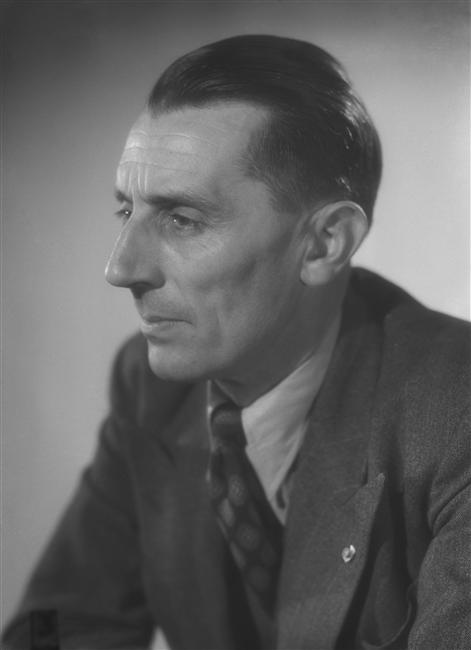
- Joliot-Curie in 1948
- Born: Jean Frédéric Joliot; 19 March 1900; Paris, French Third Republic
- Died: 14 August 1958 (aged 58); Paris, French Fourth Republic
- Education: University of Paris
- Known for: Discovering induced radioactivity Positron emission
- Spouse: Irène Curie (m. 1926; died 1956)
- Children: Hélène; Pierre
- Family: Curie (by marriage)
- Awards: Matteucci Medal (1932); Nobel Prize in Chemistry (1935); ForMemRS (1946); Hughes Medal (1947); Stalin Peace Prize (1950)
- Scientific career
- Fields: Chemistry; Physics
- Workplaces: Collège de France
- Thesis: Etude électrochimique des radioéléments : Applications diverses (1930)
- Doctoral advisor: Marie Curie
- Doctoral students: Georges Charpak, Toshiko Yuasa

Jean Frédéric Joliot-Curie (French: [fʁedeʁik ʒɔljo kyʁi]; né Joliot; 19 March 1900 – 14 August 1958) was a French chemist and physicist who received the 1935 Nobel Prize in Chemistry with his wife, Irène Joliot-Curie, for their discovery of induced radioactivity. They were the second married couple, after his parents-in-law, to win the Nobel Prize, adding to the Curie family legacy of four Nobel Prizes. Joliot-Curie and his wife also founded the Orsay Faculty of Sciences, part of the Paris-Saclay University.

== Biography ==
=== Early years ===
Born in Paris, France, Frédéric Joliot was a graduate of ESPCI Paris. In 1925 he became an assistant to Marie Curie, at the Radium Institute. He fell in love with her daughter Irène Curie, and soon after their marriage in 1926 they both changed their surnames to Joliot-Curie. At the insistence of Marie, Joliot-Curie obtained a second baccalauréat, a bachelor's degree, and a doctorate in science, doing his thesis on the electrochemistry of radio-elements.

=== Career ===
While a lecturer at the Paris Faculty of Science, he collaborated with his wife on research on the structure of the atom, in particular on the projection, or recoil, of nuclei that had been struck by other particles, which was an essential step in the discovery of the neutron by James Chadwick in 1932. In 1935 they were awarded the Nobel Prize in Chemistry for their discovery of Induced radioactivity, resulting from the creation of short-lived radioisotopes by nuclear transmutation from the bombardment of stable nuclides such as boron, magnesium, and aluminium with alpha particles.

In 1937, he left the Radium Institute to become a professor at the Collège de France. In January 1939, he wrote a letter to his Soviet colleague, Abram Ioffe, alerting him to the fact that German physicists had recently discovered nuclear fission of uranium bombarded by neutrons, releasing large amounts of energy. He went on to work on nuclear chain reactions and the requirements for the successful construction of a nuclear reactor that uses controlled nuclear fission to generate energy. Joliot-Curie was mentioned in Albert Einstein's 1939 letter to President Roosevelt as one of the leading scientists on the course to nuclear chain reactions. The Second World War, however, largely stalled Joliot's research, as did his subsequent post-war administrative duties.

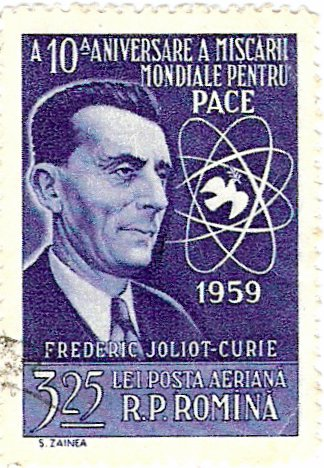
Stamp issued by Romania commemorating Frédéric Joliot-Curie ("The 10th Anniversary of the World Peace Movement")

At the time of the Nazi invasion in 1940, Joliot-Curie managed to smuggle his working documents and materials to England with Hans von Halban, Moshe Feldenkrais and Lew Kowarski. During the French occupation, he took an active part in the French Resistance. In June 1941, he took part in the founding of the National Front, and became its president. In the spring of 1942, he joined the French Communist Party to become a member of its Central Committee in 1956. Collins and LaPierre in their book Is Paris Burning? note that during the Paris uprising in August 1944, he served in the Prefecture of Police, manufacturing Molotov cocktails for his fellow insurgents, the Resistance's principal weapon against German tanks. The Prefecture was the scene of some of the most intense fighting during the uprising.

A team of scientists and intelligence officers from the allied Alsos Mission later found Curie at the Collège de France. He was sent to England to be interviewed and gave important information about the names and activities of German scientists.

=== Post-war ===
He served as director of the French National Centre for Scientific Research (CNRS), and appointed by Charles De Gaulle in 1945, he became France's first High Commissioner for Atomic Energy. In 1948, he oversaw the construction of the first French atomic reactor. He ensured that the Japanese physicist Toshiko Yuasa who had undertaken her PhD under his supervision was able to return to France and her nuclear research at the CNRS after being forced to return to Japan towards the end of the war.

He and Irène visited Moscow in June 1945 for the two hundred and twentieth anniversary of the Russian Academy of Sciences and returned sympathizing with "hard-working Russians". His affiliation with the Communist party caused Irène to be detained on Ellis Island during her third trip to the US, coming to speak in support of Spanish refugees, at the Joint Antifascist Refugee Committee's invitation. A devoted communist, he was purged in 1950 and relieved of most of his duties, but retained his professorship at the Collège de France. Joliot-Curie was one of the eleven signatories to the Russell–Einstein Manifesto in 1955. On the death of his wife in 1956, he took over her position as Chair of Nuclear Physics at the Sorbonne. Frédéric's health was by that time declining, and he died in 1958 from liver disease, which, like the death of his wife, was said to be the result of overexposure to radiation.

== Honours and awards ==
Joliot-Curie was a member of the French Academy of Sciences and of the Academy of Medicine and named a Commander of the Legion of Honour.

He was elected a Foreign Member of England's Royal Society (ForMemRS) and a foreign member of the Royal Netherlands Academy of Arts and Sciences in 1946.

Joliot-Curie appeared as himself in Kampen om tungtvannet (La bataille de l'eau lourde in French; 1948), a French–Norwegian semi-documentary film about sabotage of the Vemork heavy water plant in Norway during World War II. His assistants Hans Halban and Lev Kovarski also appear. Joliot-Curie is shown lecturing about nuclear fission and chain reaction at the Collège de France.

He was the recipient of the first (1950) Stalin Peace Prize, awarded on 6 April 1951 for his work as president of the World Council of Peace, which he carried out from 1950 until his death in 1958.

A street in Sofia, Bulgaria, and the nearby Joliot-Curie Metro Station are named after Frédéric Joliot-Curie. Other streets or squares bearing his name can be found in the Rivière-des-Prairies borough of north Montreal, Canada; in Bucharest, Târgu-Mureș, and Cluj-Napoca, Romania; in Warsaw and Wrocław, Poland; and in Poprad, Slovakia; in Potsdam, Halle and Gera, Germany.

The crater Joliot on the Moon is named after him.

As part of the dispute over the discovery and naming of the transactinides, the name "joliotium" and symbol Jl were proposed for element 102 and later element 105.

== Personal life ==
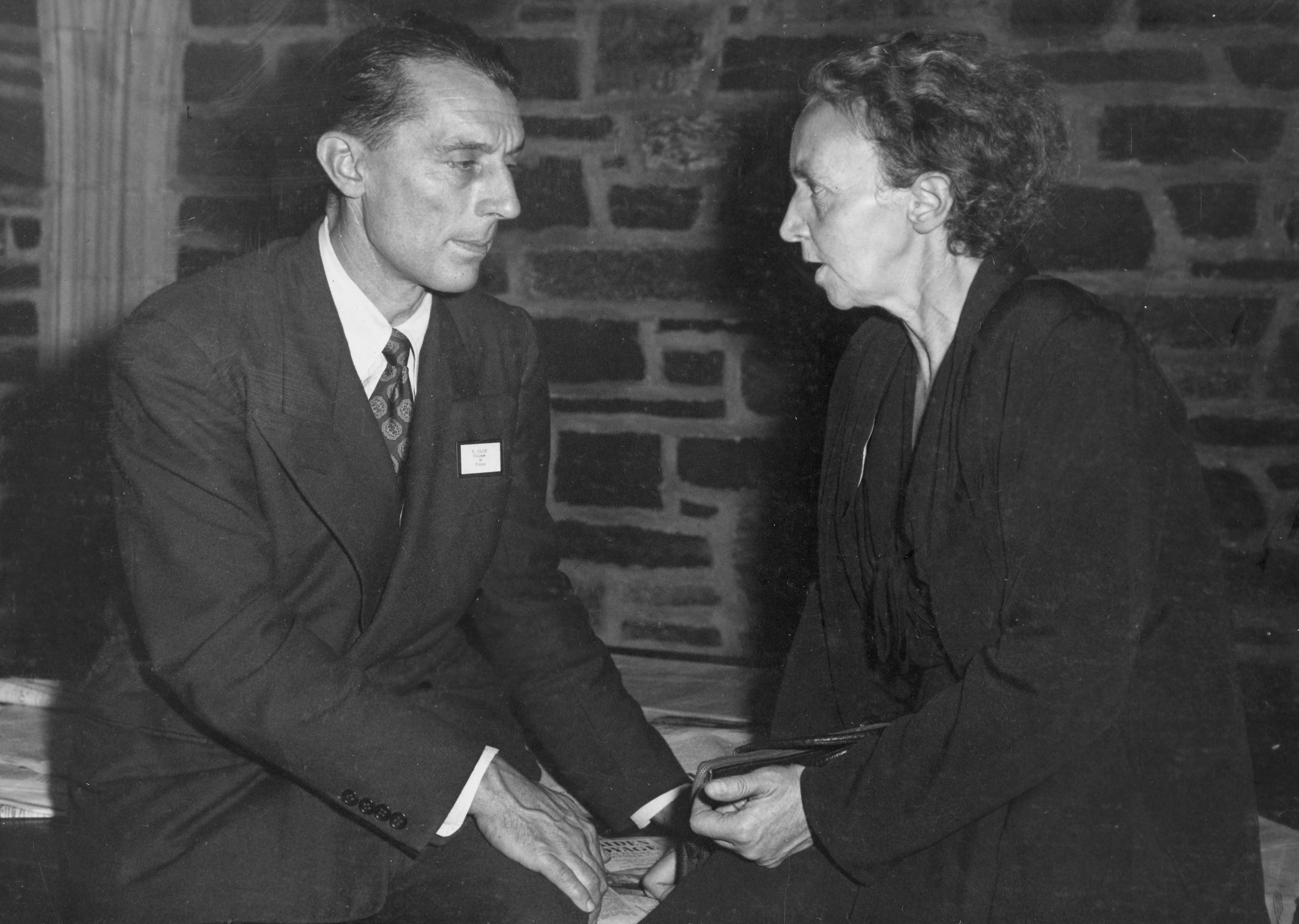
The Joliot-Curies in the 1940s

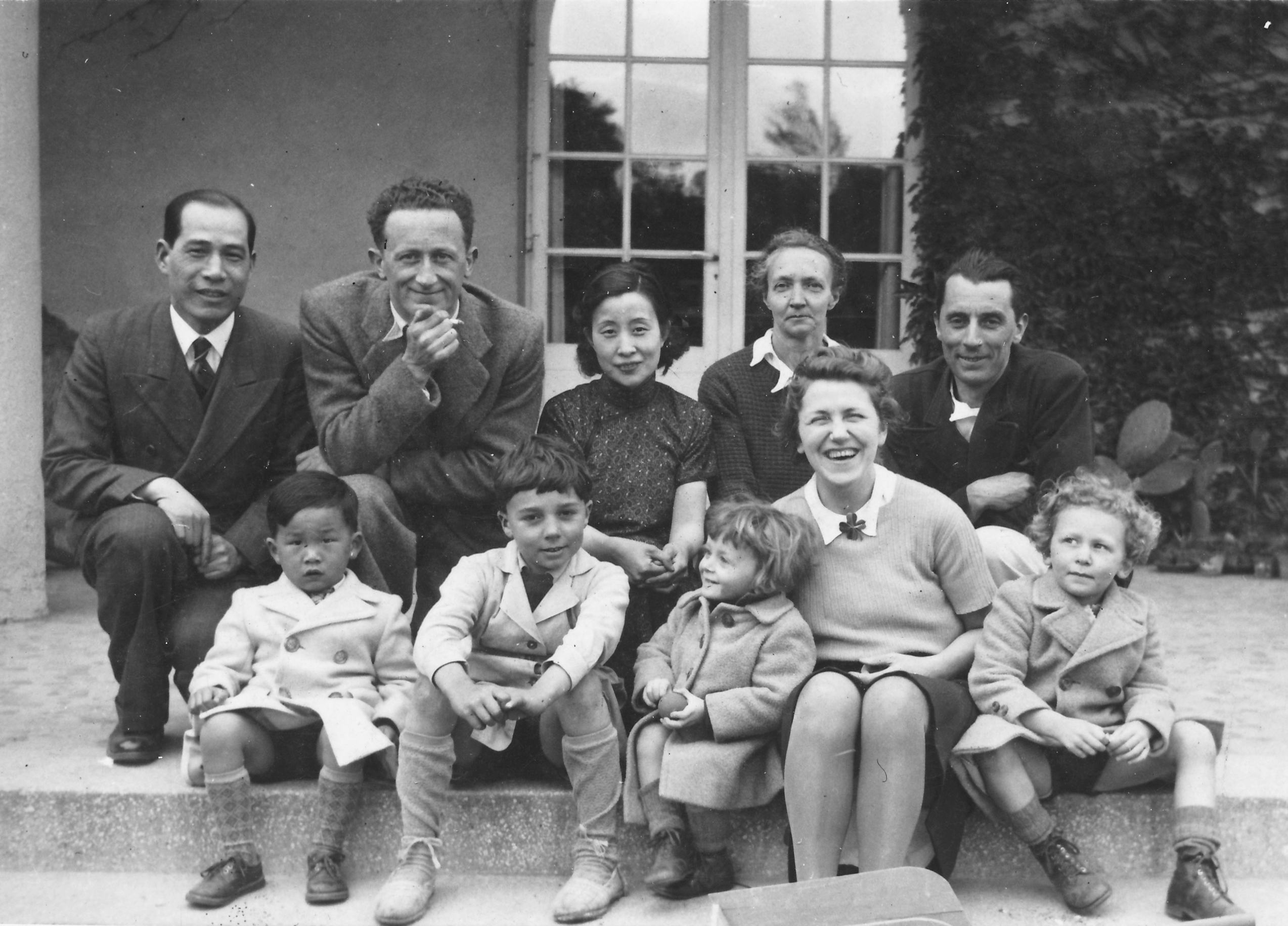
The Joliot-Curies, Biquards and Wangs in summer 1941

Frédéric and Irène hyphenated their surnames to Joliot-Curie after they married on 4 October 1926 in Paris, France, although their daughter has said, "Many people used to name my parents Joliot-Curie, but they signed their scientific papers Irène Curie and Frédéric Joliot".

Joliot-Curie's children are Hélène Langevin-Joliot, born in 1927, and her brother, Pierre Joliot, born in 1932.

Frédéric Joliot-Curie devoted the last years of his life to the creation of the Orsay Faculty of Sciences and a centre for nuclear physics at Orsay, now part of Paris-Saclay University.

== See also ==
- Radioactive (film)
