= Langevin family =

French family with some prominent scientists

- Current region: France
- Origin: Normandy, France
- Members: Paul Langevin; Jacques Solomon; Hélène Solomon-Langevin; Luce Langevin; Vige Langevin; Hélène Langevin-Joliot; Roger Dajoz; Éliane Montel; Paul-Gilbert Langevin
- Connected families: Curie family; Koechlin family
- Distinctions: physics; nuclear physics; chemistry; physical chemistry; biology

The Langevin family is a French family with some prominent scientists. The French physicist Paul Langevin, member of the French Academy of Sciences and teacher at Collège de France, is the most prominent member.

== Genealogy ==
- Philippe Pinel
  - Marie Adelaide Pinel, grand-niece of Philippe Pinel x Victor Charles Langevin
    - Victor Langevin
    - Julien Langevin
    - Paul Langevin x Jeanne Desfosses
      - Jean Langevin x Vige Langevin, daughter of Jules Grandjouan
        - Bernard Langevin x Claire Chavannes, grand-daughter of Édouard Chavannes, then X Annette Langevin, born Mirel
        - Sylvestre Langevin x Annick Balaresque
        - Noémie Koechlin, born Langevin x Yves Koechlin, son of Charles Koechlin
      - André Langevin x Luce Langevin, daughter of Hermin Dubus
        - Aline Langevin x Roger Dajoz
        - Michel Langevin x Hélène Langevin-Joliot, daughter of Frédéric Joliot and Irène Curie
          - Yves Langevin
      - Madeleine Langevin x Albert Varloteau
        - Jacques Varloteau x Béatrice Thuillier
      - Hélène Solomon-Langevin x Jacques Solomon, son of Iser Solomon, then x André Parreaux
    - Paul Langevin x +Eliane Montel
      - Paul-Gilbert Langevin x Anne-Marie Desbat
        - Paul-Éric Langevin
        - Isabelle Langevin

== See also ==
- Curie family
- Koechlin family

== Photographs ==
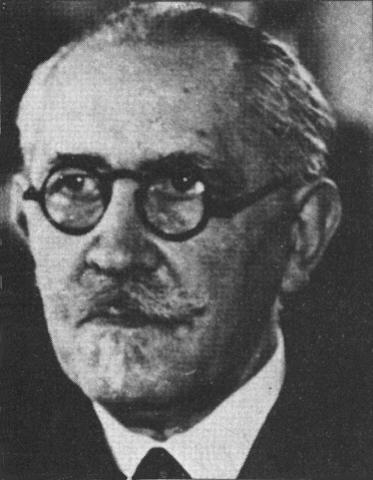
Paul Langevin.

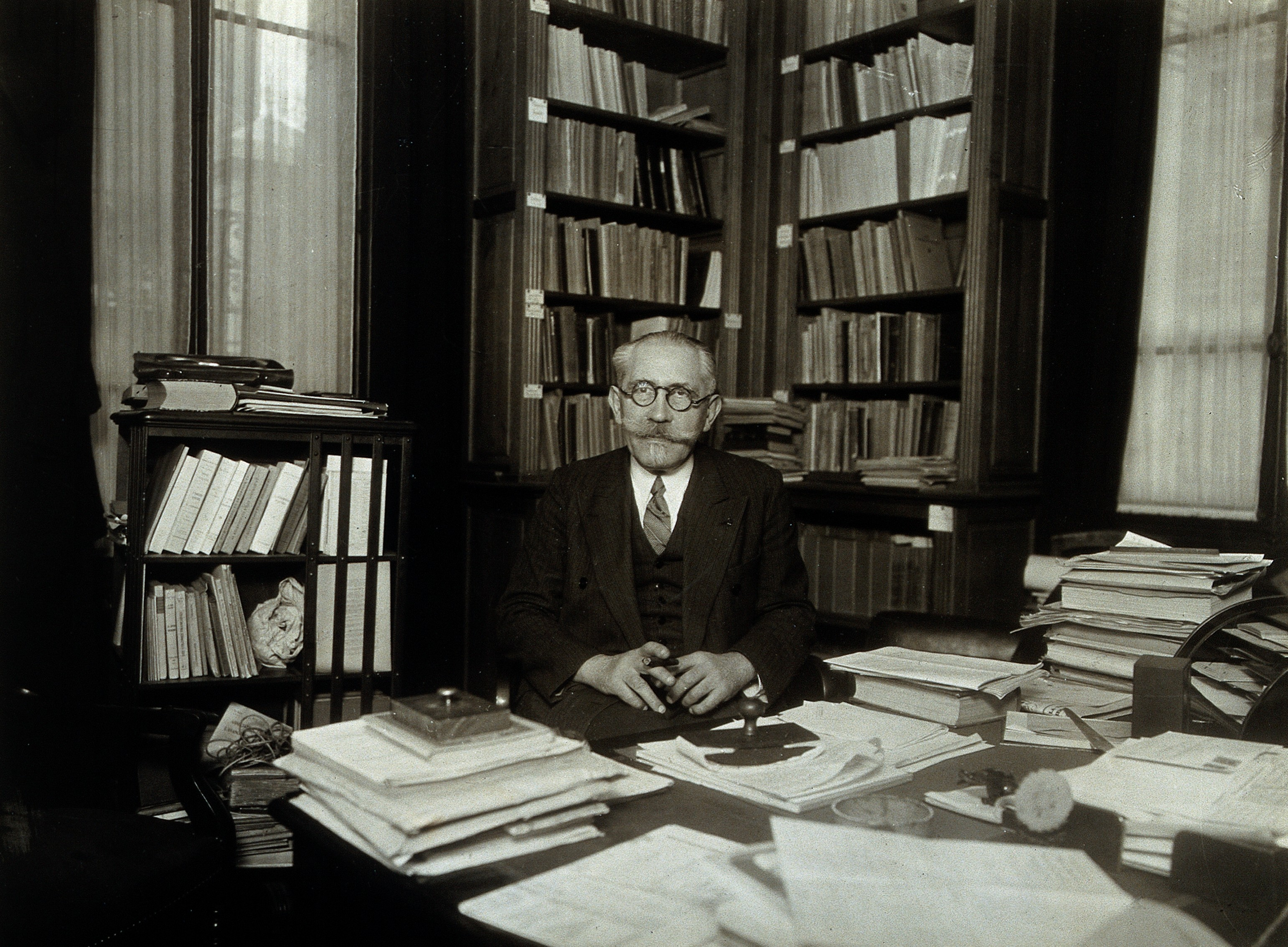
Paul Langevin, photograph by Henri Manuel.

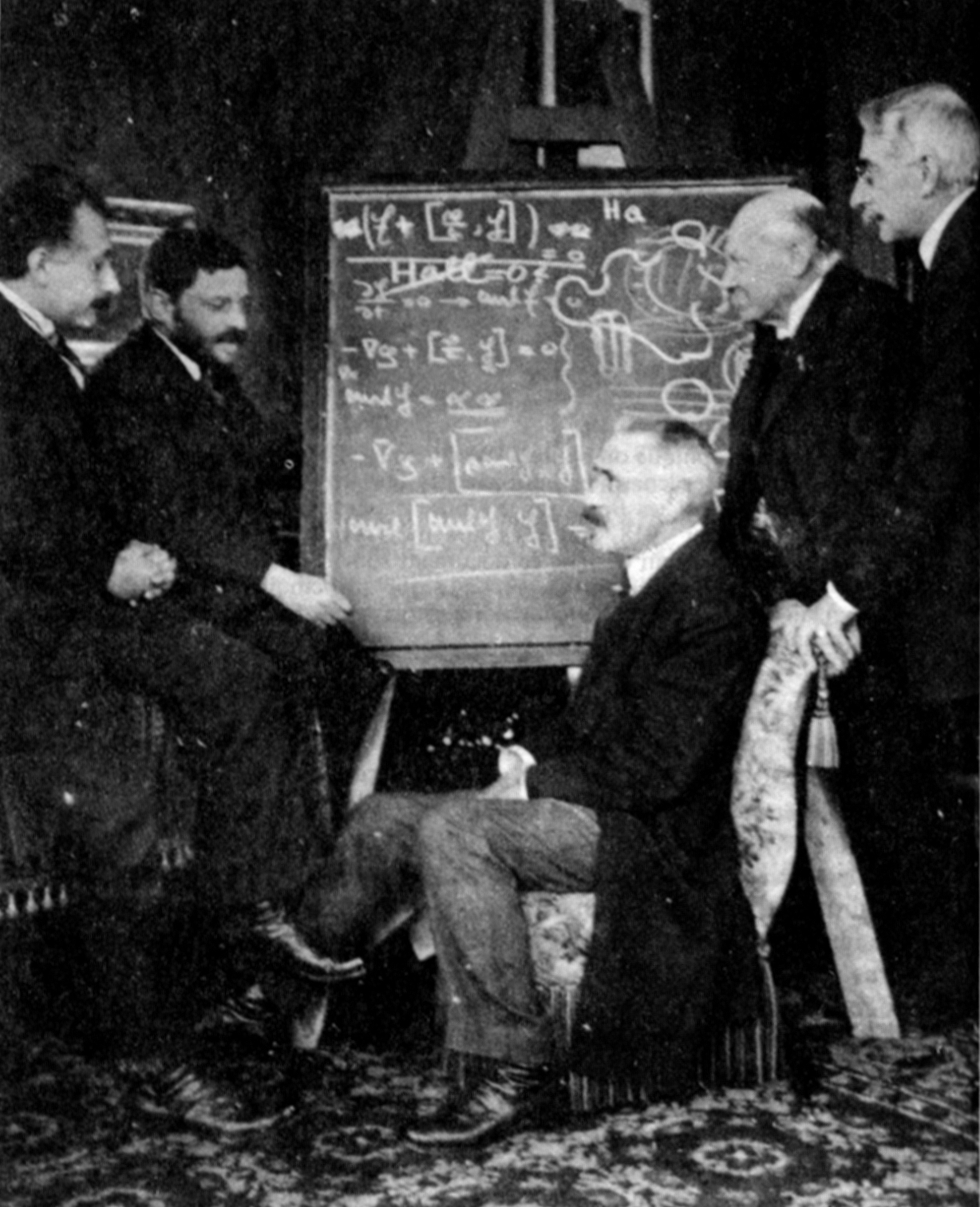
Albert Einstein, Paul Ehrenfest, Paul Langevin, Heike Kamerlingh Onnes and Pierre Weiss, in Leyde in 1920.

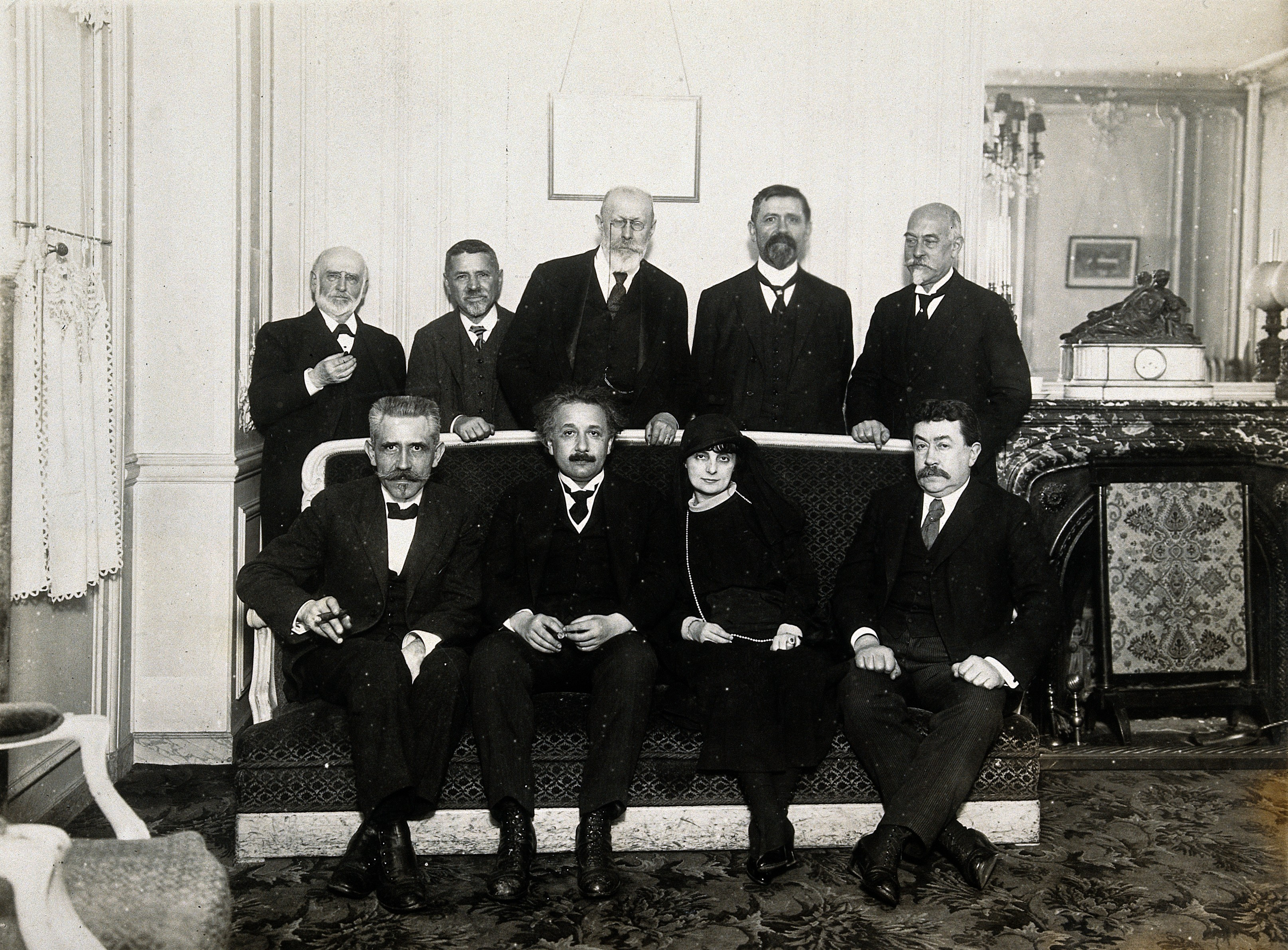
Lunch in honour of Albert Einstein, circa 1923, including Paul Langevin, Albert Einstein, Anna de Noailles, Paul Painlevé, Paul Appell, Émile Borel.

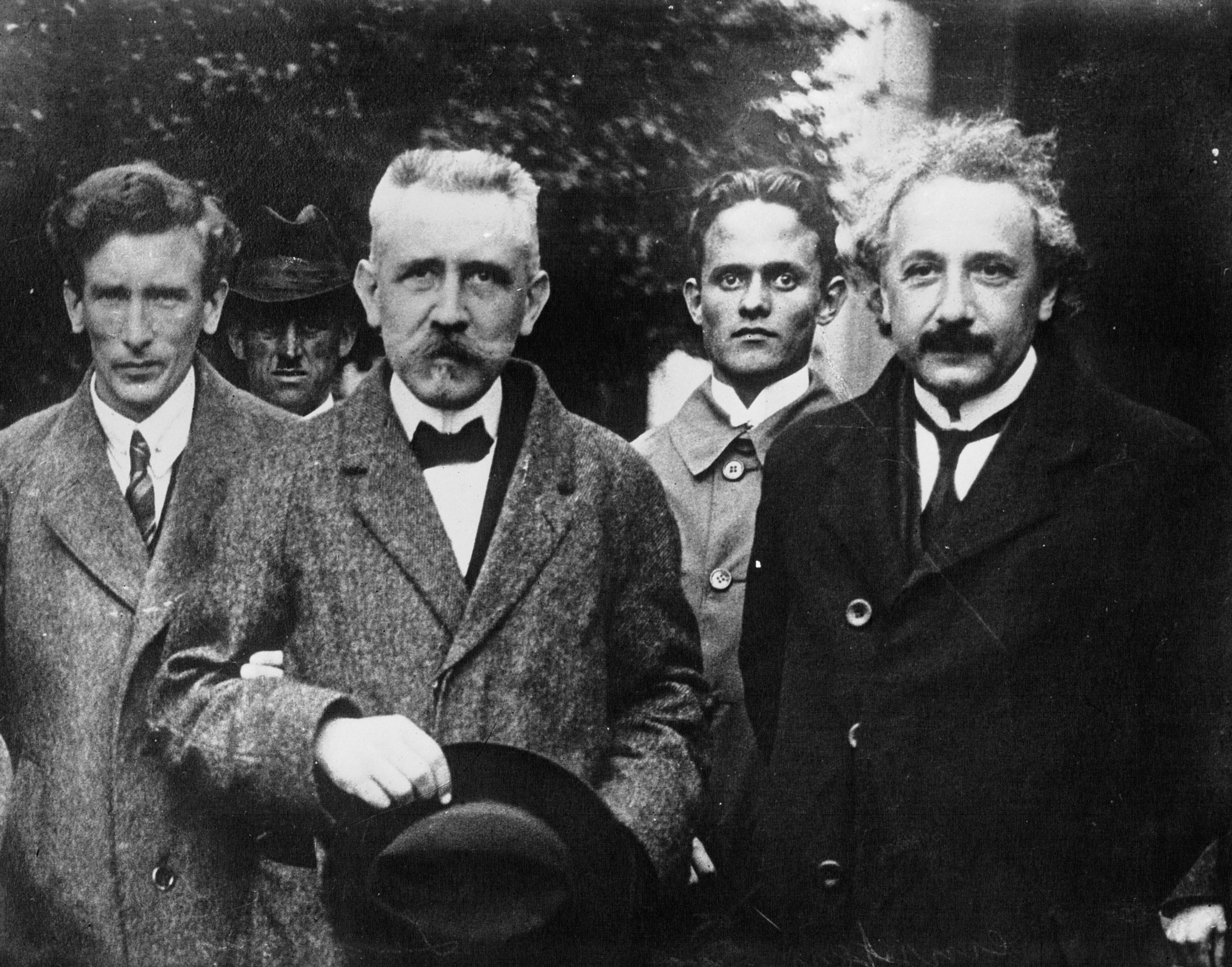
Paul Langevin and Albert Einstein in Berlin in 1923.

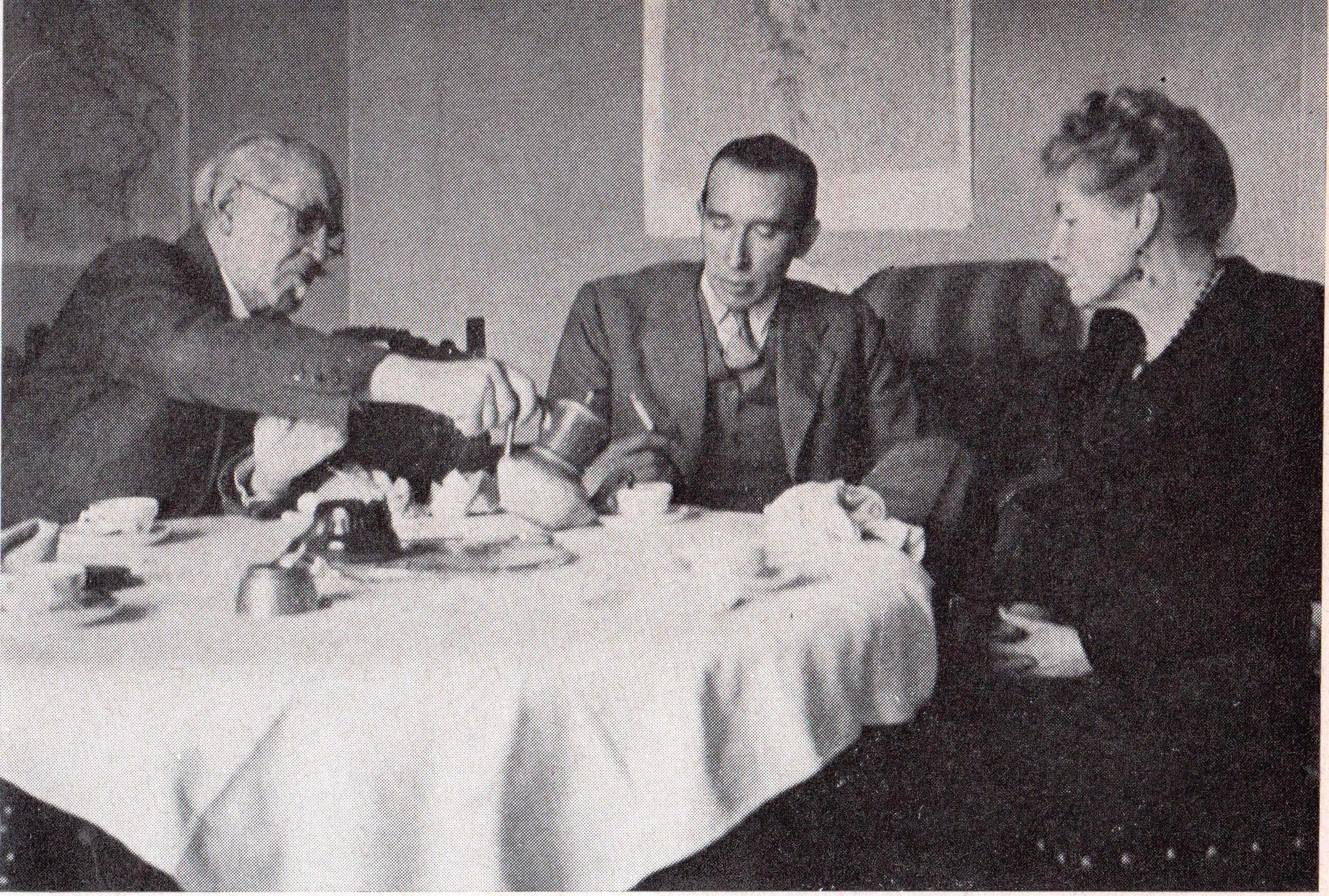
Paul Langevin, Jeanne Desfosses and their nephew Pierre Bourgeois in Troyes in 1944.

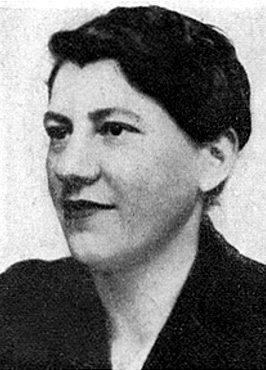
Hélène Solomon-Langevin, daughter of Paul Langevin, in 1945.

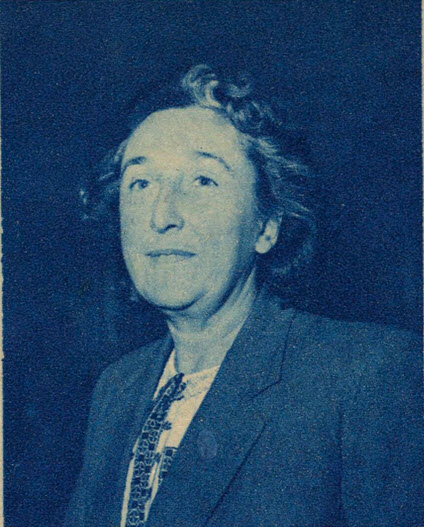
André Langevin's wife Luce Langevin in 1951.

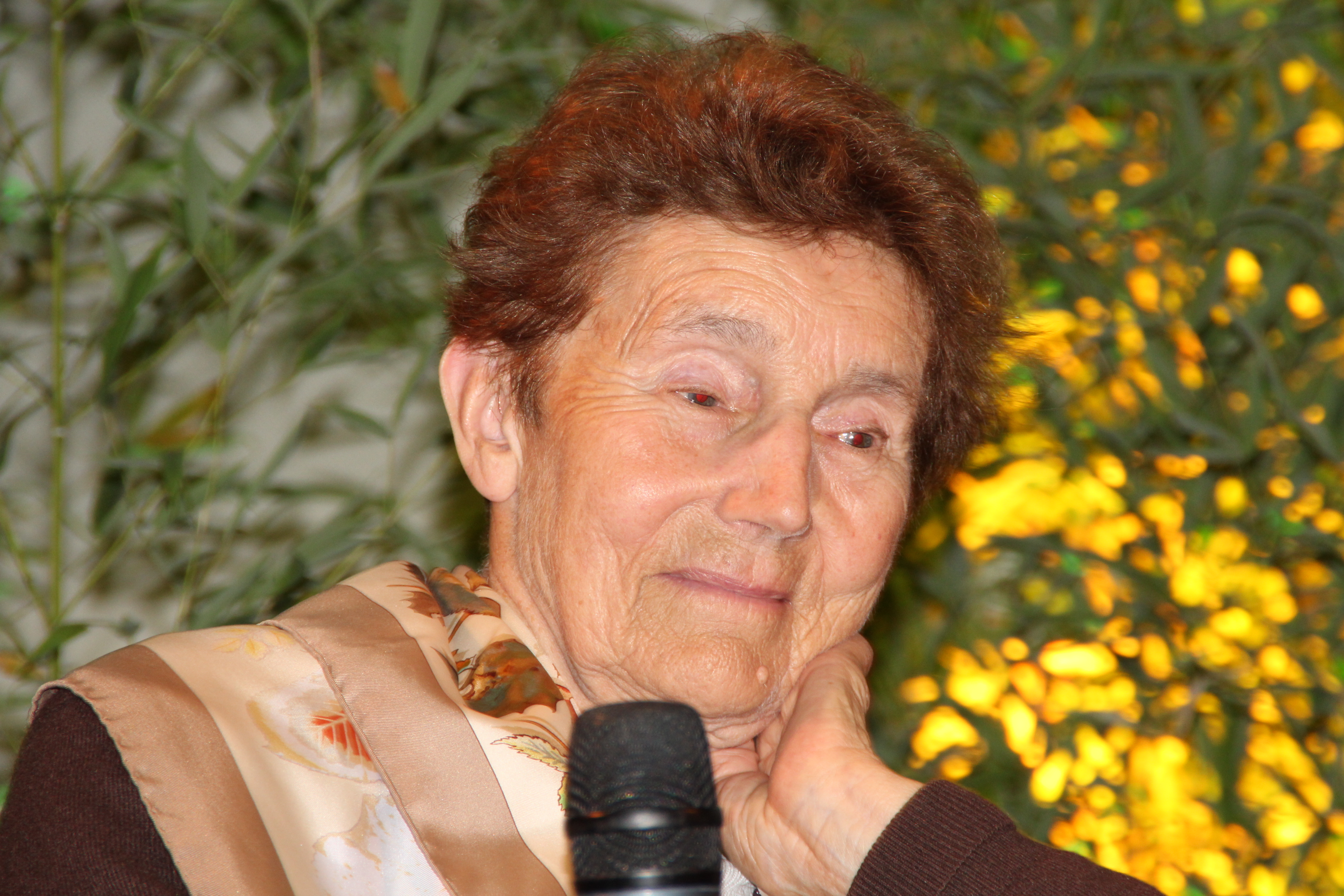
Michel Langevin's wife Hélène Langevin-Joliot in 2012.

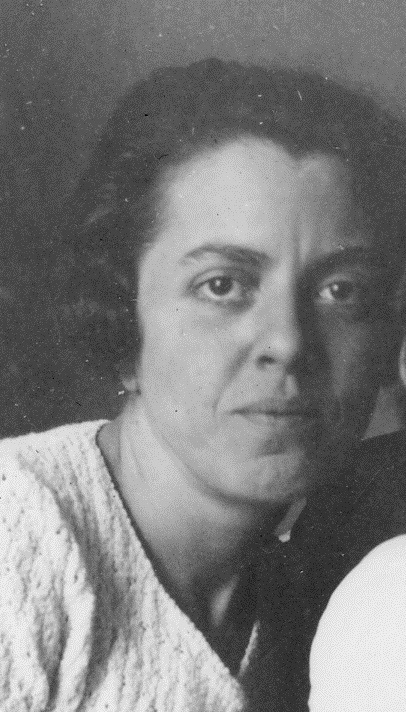
Éliane Montel in 1935.

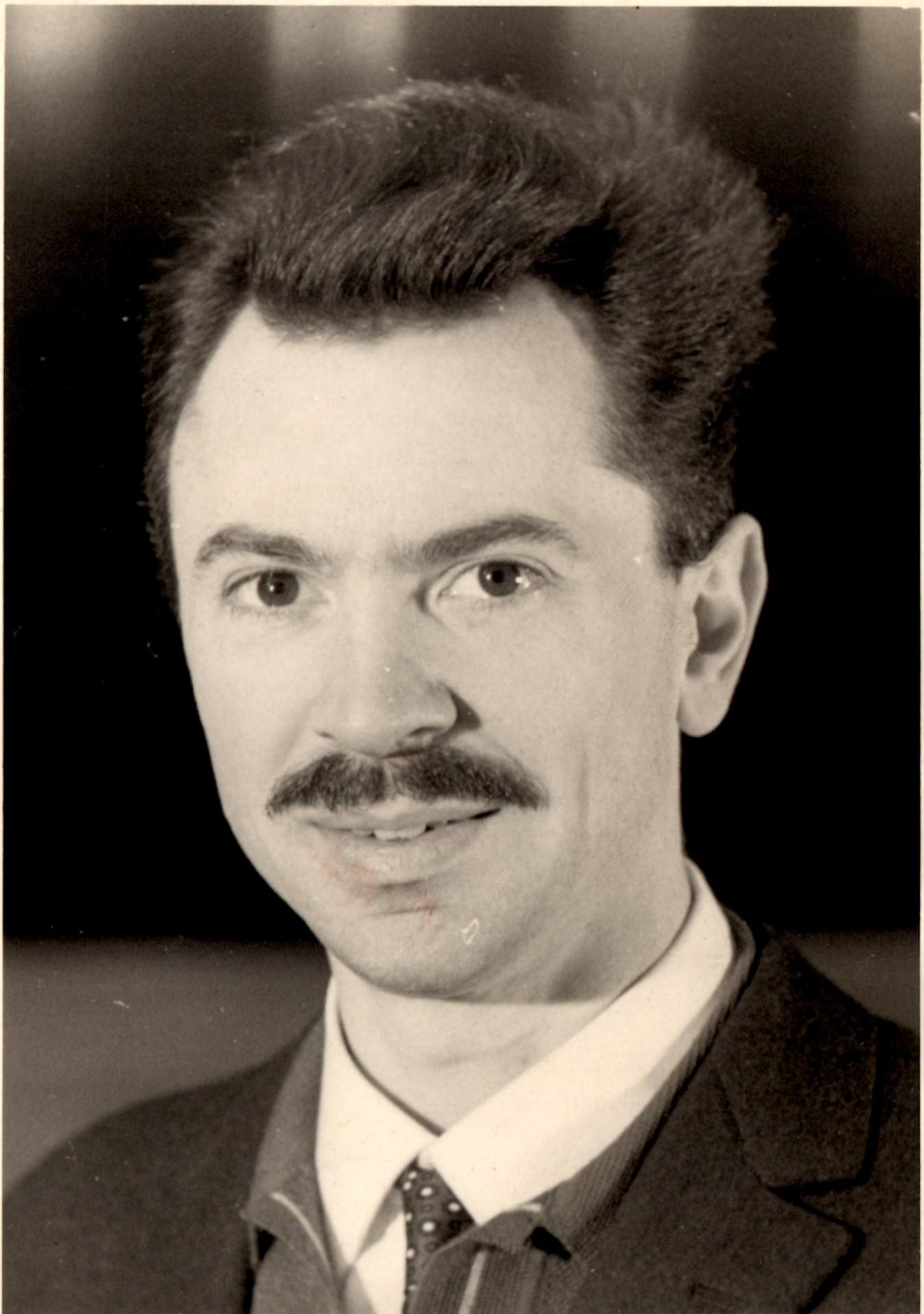
Paul-Gilbert Langevin, son of Paul Langevin and Éliane Montel.

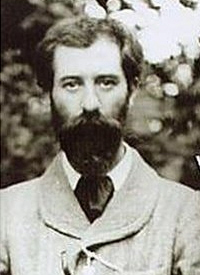
Charles Koechlin, father of Noemie Langevin's husband Yves Koechlin.

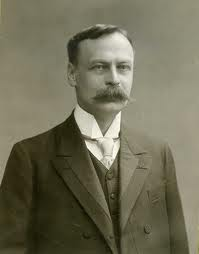
Édouard Chavannes, grandfather of Bernard Langevin's wife Claire Chavannes.

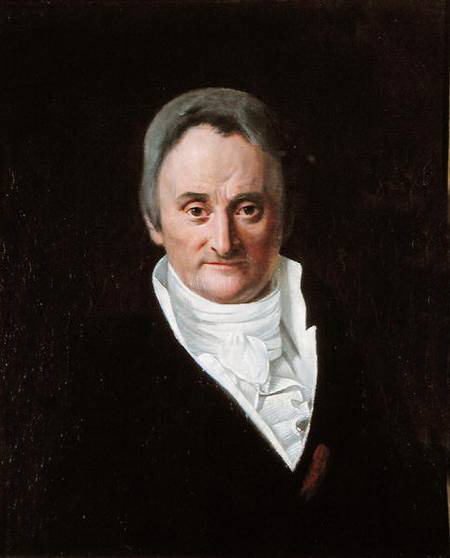
Philippe Pinel, granduncle of Paul Langevin's mother Marie-Adelaire Pinel.
