= Langevin (surname) =

Langevin is a French surname. The name comes from l'Angevin ("someone from Anjou"). The name is most commonly found in Canada, France, Mauritius and the United States.

Notable people with the surname include:

- Adélard Langevin (1855–1915), Canadian Roman Catholic archbishop
- Charles Langevin (1789–1869), Canadian businessman
- Chris Langevin (b. 1959), Canadian ice hockey player
- Dave Langevin (b. 1954), American ice hockey player
- Dominique Langevin (born 1947), French researcher in physical chemistry.
- Hector-Louis Langevin (1826–1906), Canadian politician
- James Langevin (b. 1964), American politician
- Jean Langevin (1821–1892), Canadian Roman Catholic bishop
- Luce Langevin (1899-2002), French physicist, Paul Langevin's daughter-in-law
- Michel Langevin (b. 1963), Canadian drummer, founding member of Voivod
- Paul Langevin (1872–1946), French physicist, teacher and philosopher of science
- Paul Langevin (politician) (1942-2008), Canadian politician
- Paul-Gilbert Langevin (1933-1986), French musicologist, Paul Langevin's son
- Robert Langevin, Canadian flautist
- Ronald Langevin (b. 1940), Canadian psychologist
- Vige Langevin (1898–1992), French artist, educator, writer, Paul Langevin's daughter-in-law

== See also ==
- Hélène Langevin-Joliot (b. 1927), French nuclear physicist, Frédéric Joliot and Irène Curie's daughter,
- Hélène Solomon-Langevin (1909-1995), French politician, Paul Langevin's daughter.
