= Langevin =

Langevin may refer to:

- Langevin (surname)
- 5290 Langevin, an asteroid
- Langevin (crater) on the Moon

== See also ==
- Institut Laue–Langevin, scientific facility in Grenoble, France
- Office of the Prime Minister and Privy Council, a government office building in Ottawa, Canada formerly called Langevin Block
- Physics and mathematics (named for Paul Langevin):
  - Langevin's function (and its relation to Brillouin's)
  - Langevin dynamics
  - Langevin equation
