= Jean-Charles Ablitzer =

French organist and organ teacher

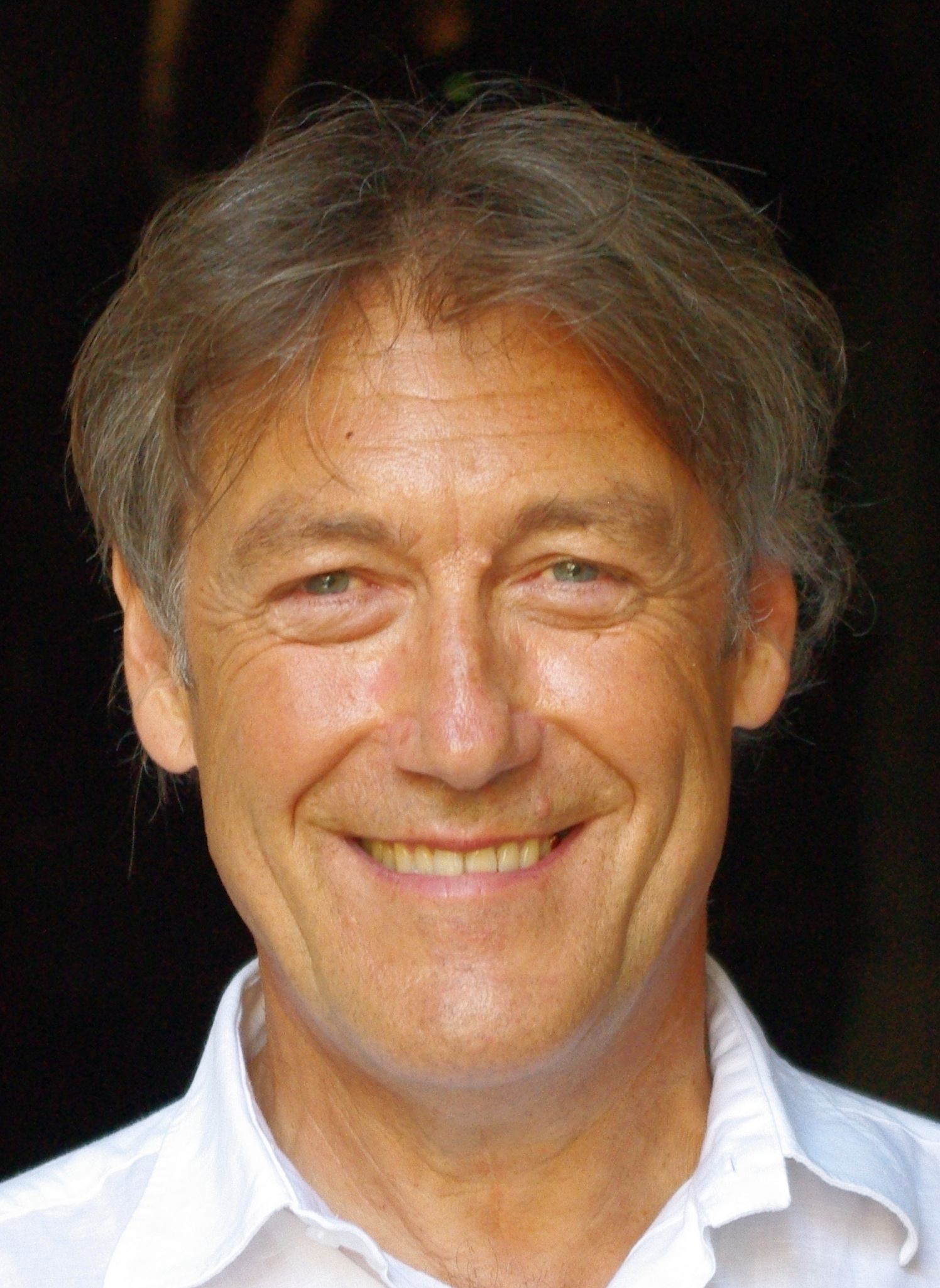
Ablitzer after a recital in Saint-Rémy-de-Provence (28 August 2010)

Jean-Charles Gaston Ablitzer (born 5 August 1946) is a French organist and pedagogue who specialises in music and organs of the Renaissance and Baroque periods.

== Biography ==
Ablitzer was born in Grandvillars in the Territoire de Belfort, a department in which he has lived in for almost all of his life. Initially self-taught, he later studied with Pierre Vidal at the Conservatoire de Strasbourg. Since 1971 he has been the organist of Belfort Cathedral, with its historical Valtrin/Callinet/Schwenkedel organ officially classed as a Monument historique. From 1971 until 2007 he was also professor of organ at the Belfort conservatory. As such, he initiated in Belfort and its environs the construction of three organs of very different styles:

- an Italian style organ by Gérald Guillemin (1979) for St. Odile's Church in Belfort
- a North-German style instrument by Marc Garnier (1984) for St. John's Temple in Belfort
- an Iberian style organ for St. Martin's Church in Grandvillars (2018), built by the Spanish firms of Joaquin Lois Cabello and Christine Vetter (pipes by the latter)

This has turned Belfort and the Territoire de Belfort, which has romantic instruments as well, into an ideal place to teach the organ.

His interest in historical instruments of the northern type, which led him to Germany (including East Germany before die Wende, which he regularly visited between 1976 and 1984), culminated in his efforts on behalf of the reconstruction of the organ David Beck built for the chapel of Gröningen castle in 1596 and on behalf of the restoration of its case; at present this organ is in Saint Martin's in Halberstadt. It was he who alerted the authorities to the deplorable state of this remarkable instrument, described by its one-time organist Michael Praetorius in his Syntagma Musicum. He is still among the driving forces behind "Organum Gruningense Redivivum", the action group campaigning for the restoration of the Beck organ, although he is now its honorary president.

== Performances ==
The music of Praetorius is particularly important for Jean-Charles Ablitzer. In 2005 he recorded Praetorius's complete organ works on the Hans Scherer organ in St Stephen's in Tangermünde (published by Alpha in 2008). On the Compenius organ in the Frederiksborg Palace, he also recorded a cd entitled Auch auff Orgeln with transcriptions for organ (by himself as well as by others) of vocal and instrumental music by Praetorius (Musique et mémoire productions). In 2006 he even made a slide show of a trip he made that took him In the Footsteps of Michael Praetorius to Wolfenbüttel, Halberstadt, Gröningen and Creuzburg, Praetorius's native city.

In addition to the complete organ works of Praetorius, Ablitzer's discography includes those of Buxtehude, Brahms and Pablo Bruna (all on Harmonic Records), as well as works by Johann Sebastian Bach, Georg Böhm, François Couperin, Jean-François Dandrieu, and others.

He has performed as a soloist all over France, where festivals like the Festival d'Avignon, Toulouse les Orgues, Musique et Mémoire (in Faucogney-et-la-Mer), and the international piano Festival de La Roque-d'Anthéron (which accommodates organists and harpsichordists besides pianists) have invited him. He has also played in numerous European countries, including Germany, Belgium, Switzerland, Austria, Spain, and Italy; in Denmark he participated in the celebrations around the 400th anniversary of the Compenius organ (1610–2010) in Frederiksborg. His concert tours have also taken him to Japan.

Ablitzer has worked with singers including Catalan baritone Josep Cabré and has been a continuo player with ensembles like Gérard Lesne's Il Seminario Musicale, in which he played continuo for fifteen years.

Among the numerous radio and television broadcasts featuring Jean-Charles Ablitzer, his regular invitations to France Musique's Organo pleno programs deserve special mention.

== Gallery ==
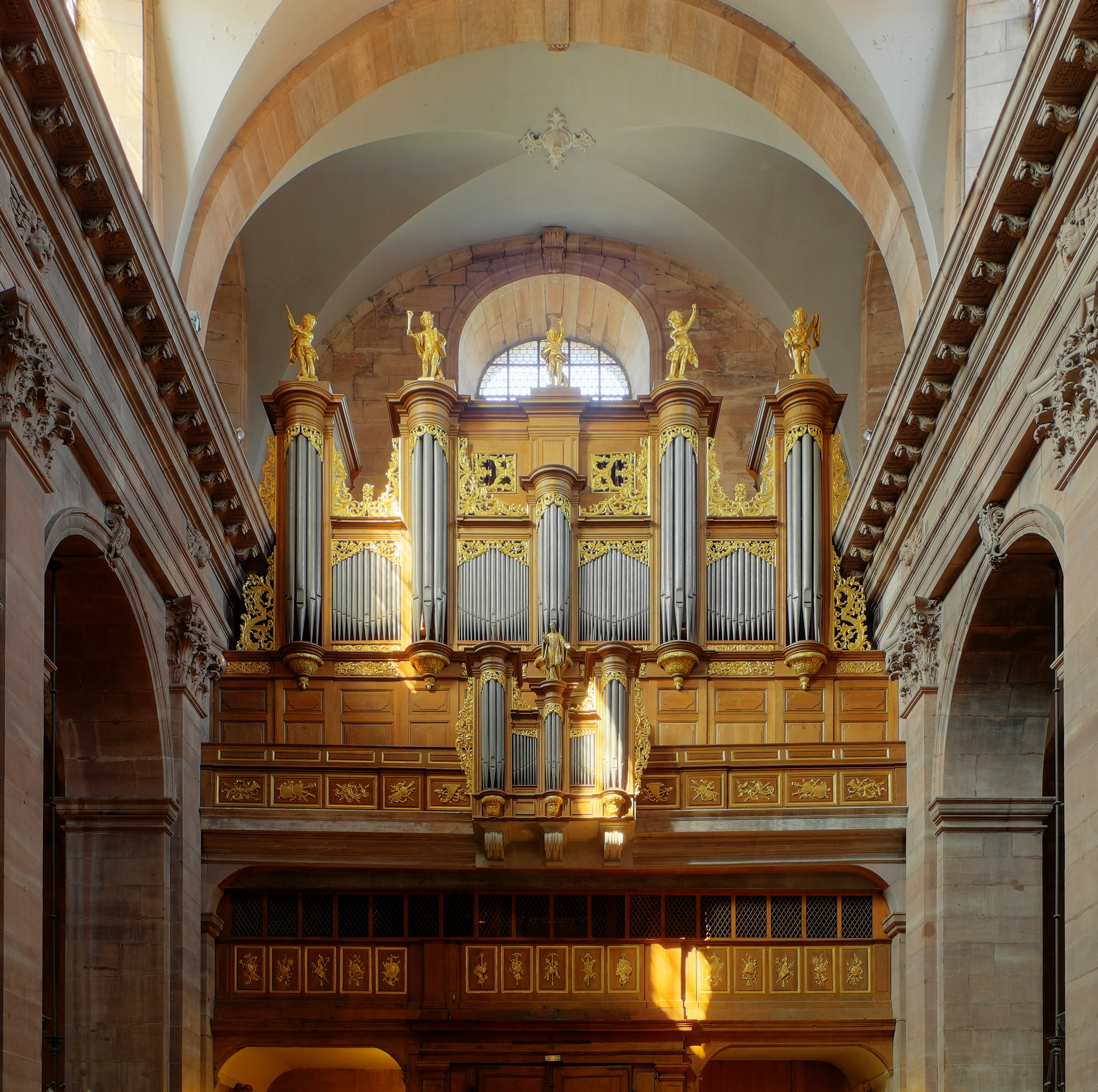
The Valtrin/Callinet/Schwenkedel organ in the cathedral of Belfort. Ablitzer is the titular organist of this cathedral.

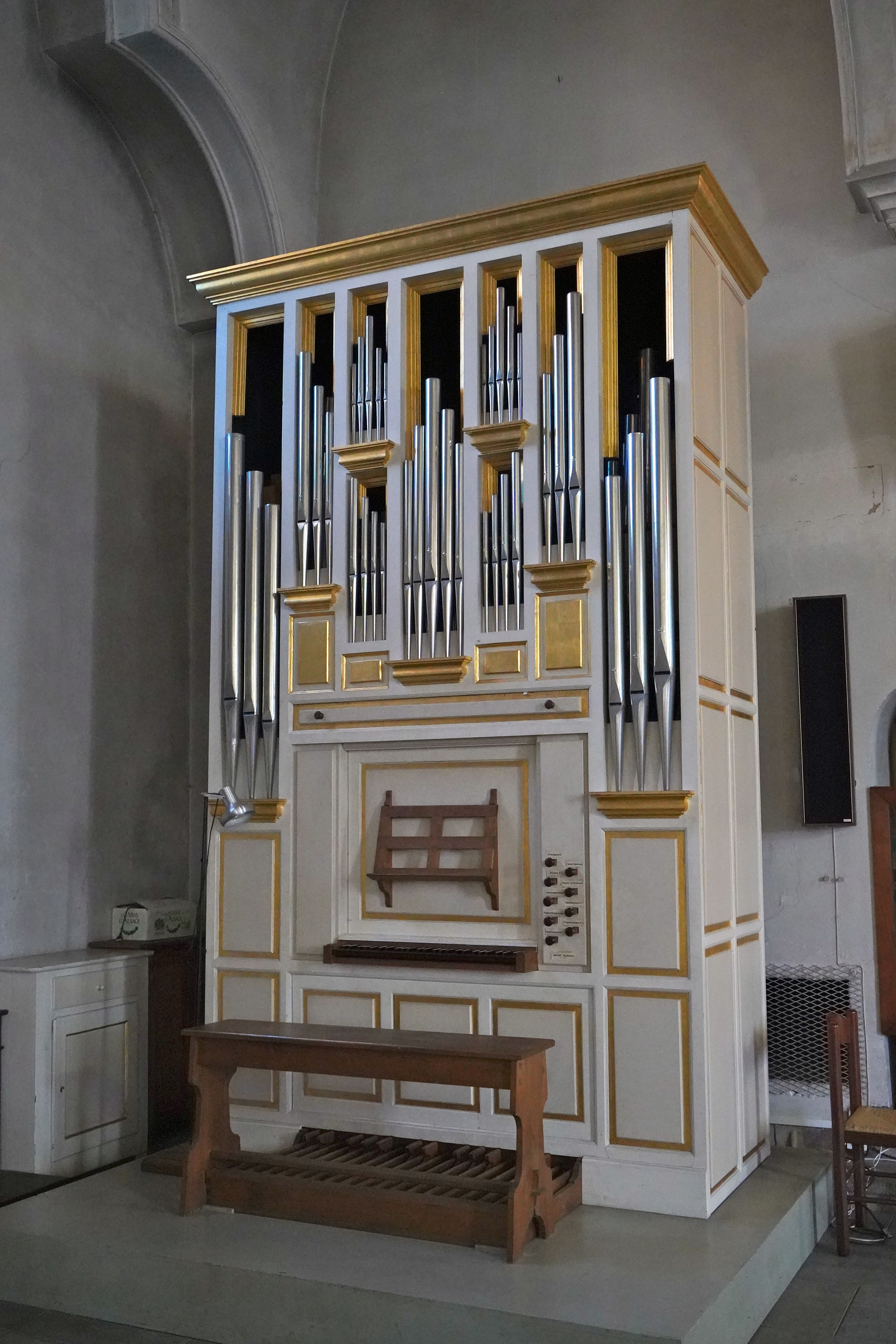
Italian style organ (Gérald Guillemin, 1979) in St. Odile's church. Ablitzer was the consultant for its building.

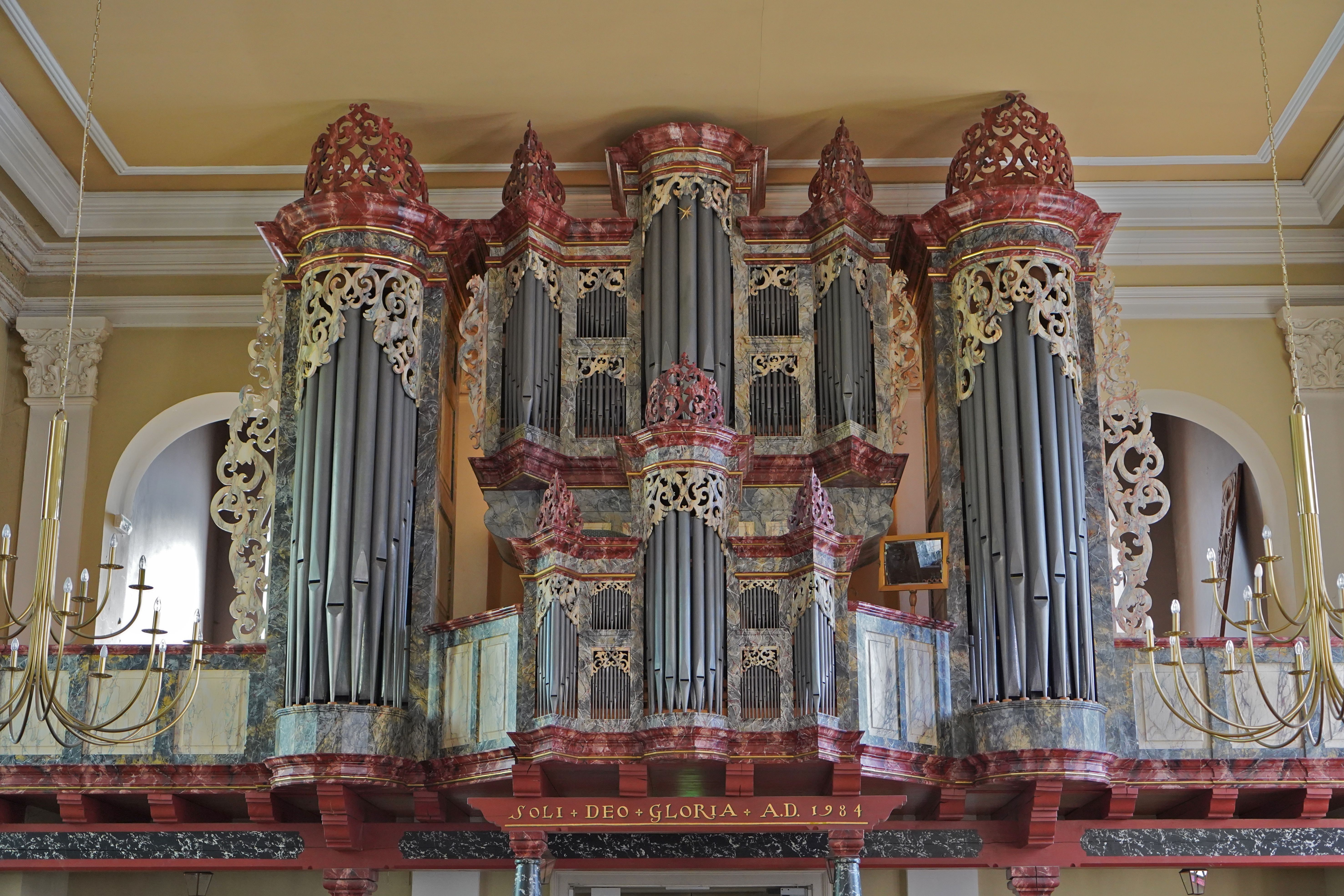
North-German style organ (Marc Garnier, 1984) in St. John's Temple. Ablitzer was the consultant for its building.

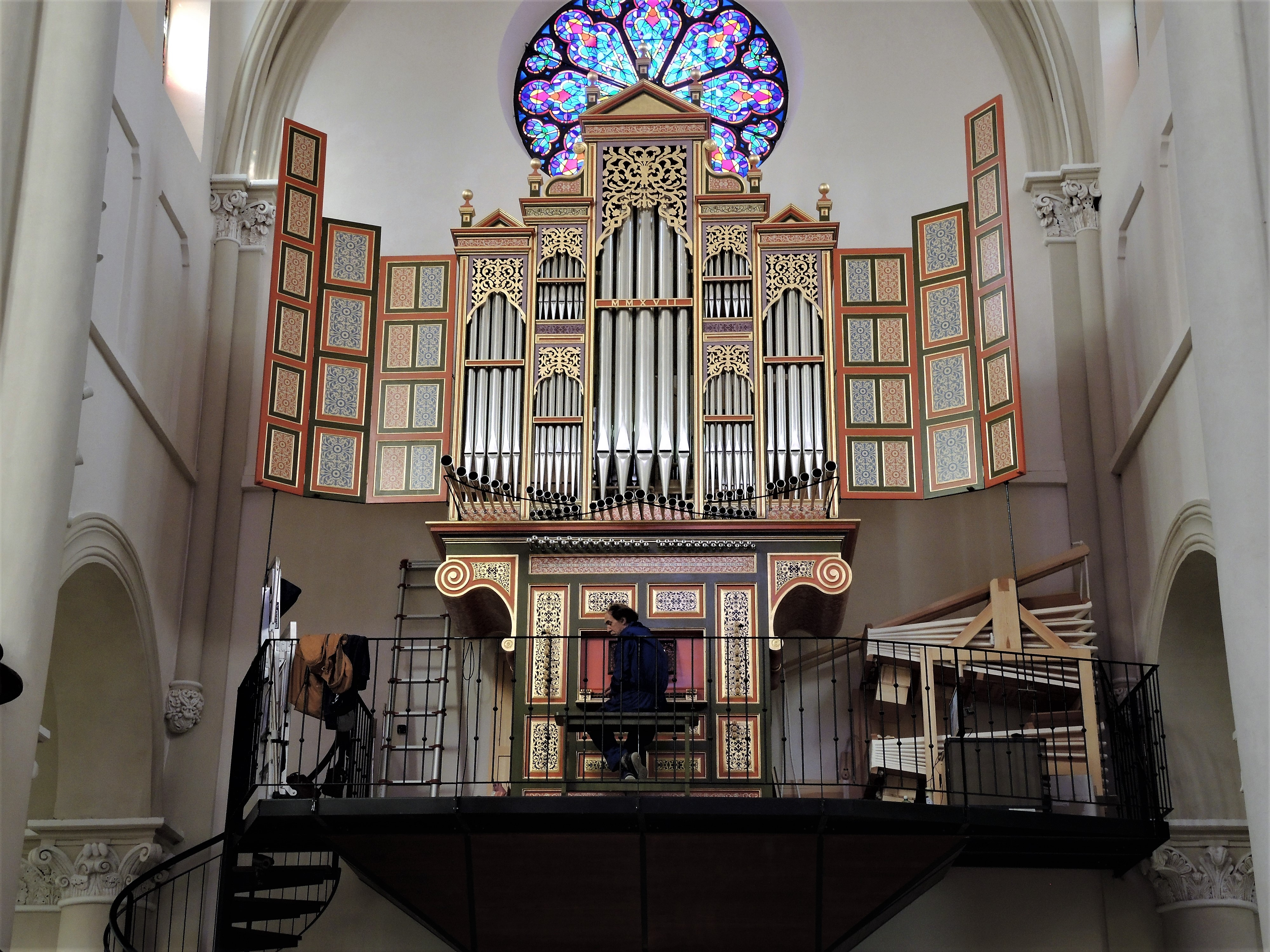
Iberian style organ (Joaquin Lois Cabello and Christine Vetter, 2018), in St. Martin's Church, Grandvillars. Ablitzer was the consultant for its building.

== Honours ==
- In 2000 Jean-Charles Ablitzer was made a Chevalier in the Ordre des Arts et des Lettres by the French ministry of culture and communication.
- A decree of the President of France dated 11 November 2010, conferred upon him the title of Chevalier in the Ordre national du Mérite, citing his "43 years of cultural activities and military service".

== Bibliography ==
- Jean-Charles Ablitzer, Organistes révolutionnaires et présence des Waltrin à Belfort. Belfort: Association les Amis de l'Orgue et de la Musique de Belfort, 2021. ISBN 979-10-699-6446-4
- Jean-Charles Ablitzer, Jacques Louis Battmann: Organiste à Belfort sous Louis-Philippe. Belfort: Association les Amis de l'Orgue et de la Musique de Belfort, 2022. ISBN 978-2-9583679-0-9

== Sources ==
- Program notes on J.-Ch. Ablitzer in Organa Saint-Rémy-de-Provence: 35ème Festival d'Orgue: Juillet/Août/Septembre 2010, published by the Association des Amis de l'Orgue de Saint-Rémy-de-Provence. In French.
- Organum Gruningense Redivivum, a trilingual (German, French, English) brochure, edited and published by Jean-Charles Ablitzer on behalf of the eponymous action group in Halberstadt, with the support of the Territoire de Belfort; available here (retrieved October 2010). Its main article, "The David Beck organ in the chapel of Gröningen castle was transferred in 1770 to St Martin's church, Halberstadt", is by Ablitzer.
- "Jean-Charles Ablitzer, organiste", an article on the website of the 17th edition of the Festival Musique et mémoire (retrieved October 2010). In French.
- Personal website of Jean-Charles Ablitzer (retrieved October 2010). In French; contains his complete discography.
