= Vige Langevin =

French writer

- Born: Edwige Grandjouan; 2 October 1898; Nantes, France
- Died: 22 September 1992 (age 93); Paris, France
- Occupation(s): Artist, writer, arts educator
- Relatives: Paul Langevin (father-in-law); Hélène Solomon-Langevin (sister-in-law)
- Family: Langevin family

Vige Langevin (2 October 1898 – 22 September 1992), born Edwige Grandjouan, was a French artist, writer and arts educator.

== Early life and education ==
Langevin was born in Nantes, the daughter of artist and writer Jules Grandjouan and teacher Bettina Simon. One of her brother was scholar Jacques-Olivier Grandjouan. She studied at the École nationale supérieure des arts décoratifs.

== Career ==
Langevin taught and wrote about art and art education. In 1951 she wrote a series of reports about arts education in France for UNESCO. In 1960, she was an adjudicator for folk dance competitions at the Llangollen International Eisteddfod.

Langevin was known for her explorations of "collective paintings", murals painted by a group, often as a classroom or community activity. An American textbook explained the process Langevin taught: "The members of the class produce small paintings. One painting is selected and divided into squares which are numbered. Each child in the class is assigned one square which he copies on a large scale on another piece of paper. Eventually the large squares are assembled to form a very large picture." Le roi et la reine and Le cheval de Troie, paintings created this way, in a classroom under Langevin and Jean Lombard's supervision, are in the collection of the Centre Pompidou.

== Publications ==
- "Le Style de la Danse Populaire en France" (1950)
- "Observations on art education for children" (1951)
- "Collective Paintings and Drawings by Children" (1951, with Jean Lombard)
- "Art education in France: principles and organization" (1951)
- "Éducation artistique des adultes en France" (1951)
- "Collective paintings" (1953)
- "L'Enseignement, en France, de la Musique et de la Danse Populaires Françaises" (1953)
- "Collective painting in a Paris school" (1959, with Jean Lombard)
- "Patrice Coirault (1875-1959)" (1959)
- Jules Grandjouan (1969)

== Personal life ==
Grandjouan married scientist Jean Langevin, son of physicist Paul Langevin. They had three children. During World War II, Langevin and her husband were members of the French Resistance. She died in 1992, at the age of 93, in Paris.
