= Martha Cecilia Bustamante =

Colombian historian of science

Martha Cecilia Bustamante de la Ossa is a Colombian historian of science specializing in early French studies of quantum mechanics, including the works of Émile Borel, Paul Langevin, and Jacques Solomon. She has worked in France as a researcher for the French National Centre for Scientific Research (CNRS), associated with the SPHERE Laboratory of CNRS and Paris Cité University.

== Education and career ==
Bustamante is originally from Calarcá in Colombia. After a master's degree in physics from the National Pedagogic University (Colombia) in 1981, she traveled to France to study astrophysics at Paris Diderot University, and received a diplôme d'études approfondies in the subject in 1984. Continuing her studies in the epistemology and history of sciences at Paris Diderot University, she completed a doctorate in 1990.

After postdoctoral research at the Laboratoire de l'Accelerateur Lineaire in Orsay from 1990 to 1993, she worked as a researcher for CNRS at SPHERE from 1993 to 2007.

== Books ==
Bustamante is the author of books including:

- À l’aube de la théorie des quanta : Notes inédites d’Émile Borel sur un cours de Paul Langevin au Collège de France (1912-1913) (Brepols, 2019)
- Jacques Solomon (1908-1942). Le destin tragique d’un physicien engagé : Une valise de manuscrits dans la clandestinité (Brepols, 2026)

== Recognition ==
Bustamante was a 2021 recipient of the Prix Paul Doistau–Émile Blutet of the French Academy of Sciences. She received the French Senate Medal in 2022.
