= Institute of Acoustics =

Institute of Acoustics may refer to:

- Institute of Acoustics, Chinese Academy of Sciences, a Chinese research institute
- Institute of Acoustics (United Kingdom), a British professional engineering institution
