= Dyschirius chiricahuae =

Scientific classification
- Domain: Eukaryota
- Kingdom: Animalia
- Phylum: Arthropoda
- Class: Insecta
- Order: Coleoptera
- Suborder: Adephaga
- Family: Carabidae
- Genus: Dyschirius
- Species: D. chiricahuae

Binomial name
- Dyschirius chiricahuae Dajoz, 2004

Species of beetle

Dyschirius chiricahuae is a species of ground beetle in the subfamily Scaritinae. It was described by Dajoz in 2004.
