= Ying Chongfu =

Chinese acoustical physicist

Ying Chongfu (C. F. Ying)
- 应崇福
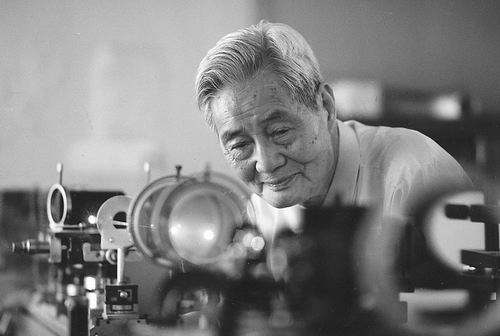
- Ying Chongfu at work in 2008
- Born: June 15, 1918; Ningbo, Zhejiang, China
- Died: June 30, 2011 (aged 93); Beijing, China
- Education: Huachung University; Tsinghua University; Brown University
- Scientific career
- Fields: Acoustical physics, Ultrasonics

Ying Chongfu or C. F. Ying (Chinese: 应崇福; June 15, 1918 – June 30, 2011) was a Chinese acoustical physicist who was the founder and pioneer of ultrasonics research in China., specializing in dispersion of ultrasonics in solids, ultrasonic piezoelectric transducers, ultrasonic propagation in soft tissues, power ultrasonics, laser ultrasound and acoustic cavitation. An academician of the Chinese Academy of Sciences (CAS), Ying was a research professor at Institute of Acoustics (IOA) of CAS, inaugural Chairman of the Acoustical Society of China (ASC) and Editor-in-Chief of the academic journal Applied Acoustics.

== Early life and education ==
Ying was born in 1918 in Ningbo, Zhejiang, China to a middle-class family. His father was an accountant working for a British firm in China. Ying grew up in Wuhan and was taught English since very young age. In 1940, he graduated from the Christian missionary college Huachung University and received his master's degree from Physics Department of Tsinghua University in 1945. Ying went to the U.S. in 1948 with a scholarship of Huachung University. He studied electronics with Prof. H. E. Farnsworth in Brown University where he received the Ph.D. degree in 1951.

== Career ==
In 1951, Ying started to work for Prof. Rohn Truell's Metals Research Laboratory of Brown University and co-authored with Prof. Truell a series of research papers. Three of them are regarded as laying the foundation for the later development of ultrasonics, according to the Institute of Acoustics of CAS and some researchers around the world:

- "Complicated Domain Patterns on Iron‐Silicon Single Crystals", published in Journal of Applied Physics (Dec. 1952)
- "The Effect of Hydrogen on Ultrasonic Attenuation and Velocity Measurements in Titanium", published in Acta Metallurgica (May 1954)
- "Scattering of a Plane Longitudinal Wave by a Spherical Obstacle in an Isotropically Elastic Solid", published in Journal of Applied Physics (October 1956)

In 1956, Ying came back to China and entered into the Chinese Academy of Sciences, served as researcher at Institute of Applied Physics; then in 1957, director of research at the Institute of Electronics; and then in 1964, director of research at the newly founded Institute of Acoustics. He dedicated himself in promoting the research and applications of ultrasonics in China despite the turbulences of the political movements beginning to overwhelm the Chinese society since early 1960s. During the Cultural Revolution(1966-1976), Ying was tortured, saw his liberty denied during 8 months and once attempted suicide in 1968, while his first spouse died of cancer in a camp in southern China.

Ying was appointed the deputy director of the Institute of Acoustics in 1978 when the IOA was reconstituted in the aftermath of the Cultural Revolution. From 1978 to his death in 2011, Ying made numerous breakthroughs in research, education, and was granted national awards for 4 times by the Chinese government.

He has also multiplied the international interactions in the fields of ultrasonics with researchers from western countries. In 1980, he was named overseas editor by the British scientific journal "Ultrasonics" and American "Wave Motion".

In 1990, Ying published another influential research paper "Photoelastic Visualization and Theoretical Analyses of Scatterings of Ultrasonic Pulses in Solids" in the scientific journal Physical Acoustics and a 600-page treatise in Chinese entitled Ultrasonics.

In October 1993, Ying was elected academician of CAS.

Ying dedicated the last decade of his life to the research of acoustic cavitation, in which China considered itself lagged behind.
