= Jacques Solomon =

French physicist (1908–1942)

- Police photo from 17 March 1942
- Born: 4 February 1908; Paris, France
- Died: 23 May 1942 (aged 34); Fort Mont-Valérien, Paris, France
- Occupation: Physicist
- Known for: Research in quantum mechanics

Jacques Solomon (4 February 1908 – 23 May 1942) was a French physicist and Marxist who played a central role in the debate over quantum mechanics in France in the 1930s and early '40s. During the German occupation of France in World War II, he was arrested and killed by firing squad at Fort Mont-Valérien in 1942.

== Early years ==
Jacques Solomon was born into a Jewish family on 4 February 1908 in the 18th arrondissement of Paris. His father Iser Solomon was a medical radiologist and member of various learned societies in Europe and America. Jacques was a brilliant pupil at Collège Rollin and became an intern at the Hôpitaux de Paris. He then began studying physics and mathematics at the Sorbonne. At the time, the physics course covered areas such as optics, electricity, and classical mechanics, but not more recent subjects such as statistical mechanics, Maxwell's electromagnetism, or the controversial new areas of relativity and quantum mechanics.

Solomon was researching theoretical physics at the Centre national de la recherche scientifique in 1929 when he married Hélène Langevin (1909–95), daughter of Paul Langevin (1872–1946), a professor at the Collège de France. In 1931, Solomon submitted a thesis on electrodynamics and quantum theory, which earned him recognition as one of the leading French physicists of that period. At age 29, he started teaching at the Collège de France.

Both Solomon and Matvei Petrovich Bronstein believed in the need for a radically different method of treating quantum gravity, since the present theory of field quantization seemed incompatible with the non-linear theory of gravitation. Both men were murdered by the totalitarian regimes of Nazi Germany and the Soviet Union, respectively. Solomon was killed in 1942, but Bronstein was killed before the war. In August 1937, while he was living in his apartment at 38 Rubinstein Street, St. Petersburg, Bronstein was arrested as part of the Great Purge. He was convicted by a list trial in February 1938 and executed the same day in a Leningrad prison.

In 1934, Solomon joined the French Communist Party (PCE). He taught at the Open University, and contributed to the Cahiers du Bolchevisme and to L'Humanité. In 1935, he worked for the election of Paul Rivet, the first member of the Popular Front to be elected. After the Munich Agreement of 30 September 1938, he was one of the secretaries of the Union des intellectuels français pour la justice, la liberté et la paix (UDIF).

Solomon's 1939 book Protons, Neutrons, Neutrinos was praised by a reviewer for its "clear and thorough account" of Beta-ray phenomena; the reviewer noted, however, that the book ran the risk of quickly becoming out-of-date given the rapid advances occurring at the time in the understanding of atomic nuclei.

== World War II ==
With the outbreak of World War II (1939–45), Solomon was mobilized in the medical service, first in Courseulles, Calvados, and then in Agen. He was demobilized at the end of June 1940 and after a month returned to Paris. Georges Politzer was in touch with the clandestine PCE through Pierre Villon, and in September and October 1940 Solomon, Georges Politzer and Jacques Decour tried to contact and organize the universities. After Paul Langevin was arrested by the Germans on 30 October 1940 Solomon, Politzer and Fernand Holweck organized protests by students and professors in front of the College de France on 5 and 8 November 1940. He adopted the pseudonym "Jacques Pinel", and with his wife was one of the main contributors to the Université libre, which began to appear in November 1940 and exposed the "obscurantism" and antisemitism of the Vichy regime. He also contributed to La Pensée libre.

Solomon was arrested by the special brigades on 2 March 1942 in a Paris cafe where he was having a working meeting for L'Université with Dr. Jean-Claude Bauer, who was also arrested. Solomon's colleague Georges Politzer had been arrested two weeks earlier. Solomon was interned at the police station until 20 March, then at the Cherche-Midi prison until 11 May, and finally at La Santé Prison.

At the Nuremberg trials, French Resistance member Marie-Claude Vaillant-Couturier testified that she was imprisoned at La Santé in an adjacent cell to Solomon. She said he was "horribly tortured" and on the day of his execution he told his wife Hélène (who was also under arrest at La Santé), "I cannot take you in my arms, because I can no longer move them."

Solomon was handed over to the Germans and executed as a hostage on 23 May 1942 at Fort Mont-Valérien on the same day as Politzer and Bauer. In total, 84 hostages were executed that month. The last four, executed on 30 May 1942 in reprisal for an attempted assassination in Le Havre on 23 May 1942, were Arthur Dallidet, Félix Cadras, Jacques Decour and Louis Salomon.

After her husband's execution, Hélène was taken to the Auschwitz concentration camp, then to Ravensbrück concentration camp. She managed to survive the war, and lived on until 1995. In 1951, Jacques Solomon was given the posthumous title of Commandant of the Front Nationale.

== Main publications ==
- Solomon, Jacques (1931). L'Électrodynamique et la théorie des quanta (in French). Masson. p. 95.
- —— (1936). Théorie du passage des rayons cosmiques à travers la matière (in French). Hermann & cie. p. 64.
- —— (1938). Les grands problèmes de l'économie politique contemporaine: L'agriculture dans l'économie française (in French). Bureau d'éditions. p. 34. Co-written with Georges Politzer and Pierre George.
- —— (1939). Protons, neutrons, neutrinos: leçons professées au Collège de France (in French). Gauthier-Villars. p. 228.
- —— (1939). La pensée française, des origines à la Révolution (in French). Union française universitaire. p. 50.

== Sources ==
- Bernadac, Christian (1992). Déportation, 1933-1945 (in French). France-Empire. ISBN 978-2-7048-0709-3.
- Bustamante, Martha Cecilia (1997). "Jacques Solomon (1908-1942) : profil d'un physicien théoricien dans la France des années trente". Revue d'histoire des sciences (in French). 50 (50–1–2).
- Besse, Jean-Pierre; Pouty, Thomas (2006). Les fusillés: répression et exécutions pendant l'occupation, 1940-1944. Editions de l'Atelier. ISBN 978-2-7082-3869-5.
- Cao, Tian Yu (1999). Conceptual Foundations of Quantum Field Theory. Cambridge University Press. ISBN 978-0521631525.
- "Hélène SOLOMON, née Langevin épouse Parreaux – 31684". Mémoire vive (in French). 2012.
- Houssin, Monique (2004). "Jacques SOLOMON". Résistantes et résistants en Seine-Saint-Denis: un nom, une rue, une histoire (in French). Editions de l'Atelier. ISBN 978-2-7082-3730-8.
