= Luce Langevin =

French physicist, activist and teacher

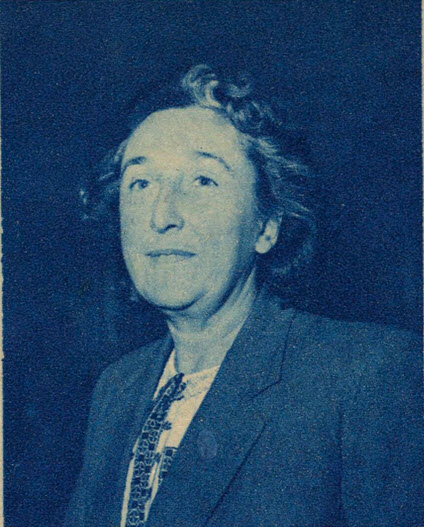
Luce Langevin (1951).

Luce Langevin, born Luce Dubus (26 December 1899 in Marissel – 27 August 2002 in Paris) was a French physicist, teacher at Fénelon high school in Paris and a communist activist.

== Biography ==
Luce Dubus was a student at the École Normale Supérieure de jeunes filles de Sèvres in the 1920s. She graduated the agrégation competition in two specialities, physical sciences and biology.

She married André Langevin, French physicist Paul Langevin's son. She was very influenced by her stepfather, for whom she was full of admiration. André and Luce gave birth to two children, nuclear physicist Michel Langevin and anglicist Aline Dajoz.

From 1930 to 1960, she was a teacher at Fénelon high school in Paris.

From 1934, she was an activist in the World feminist meeting against war and fascism. Then she signed the French petition for intervention during the Spanish civil War.

In 1935, she joined the French Communist Party and took part to the 1936 strikes in France. She was a member of the Université Libre. After the liberation of Paris in 1944, she was still a scientist, a teacher and a communist activist for several years until she retired.

She wrote many scientific and political papers published in La Pensée and a book on the Russian philosopher Mikhail Lomonosov.

She died in Paris in 2002 at the age of 102.

== Publications ==
- Miracle of TSF : history of telegraph and phone, Bourrelier, 1952.
- « Materialism and empiriocriticism » and the teaching of physics, La Pensée, 1959.
- Lomonosov (1711-1765) : his life and works, Éditions sociales, Paris, 1967.
- The first French communist intellectuals, with Georges Cogniot, La Pensée, 1967.
- Gassendi translated in Russian. When will a french translation be published?, La Pensée, 1968.
- Thinking machines and thought, La Pensée, 1969.
- Mendeleev's law is a hundred years old, La Pensée, 1970.
- The meaning of history of sciences in education, La Pensée, 1972.
- Paul Langevin and Albert Einstein, from new letters and documents, La Pensée, 1972.
- Ecology and politics, La Pensée, 1973.
- USSR's Academy of Sciences is 250 years old, La Pensée, 1976.
