= Georges Cogniot =

French writer, philosopher and politician

Georges Cogniot (15 December 1901 in Montigny-lès-Cherlieu, Haute-Saône – 12 March 1978) was a French writer, philosopher and politician of the French Communist Party.

== Biography ==
He was born Georges Auguste Alexandre Cogniot in to a middle-class family and graduated from École normale supérieure.

A member of the French Communist Party since 1922 he was elected to its central committee in 1926. Prior to the Second World War he was elected to the French National Assembly as part of the Popular Front. He was an organizer of the World Committee Against War and Fascism and protested against the Munich Agreement. He was the representative of the PCF in the Executive Committee of the Communist International and also succeeded Paul Vaillant-Couturier as editor of L'Humanité.

In 1938 with Paul Langevin, he created the Marxist journal La Pensée.

After the Nazi invasion of France, he was conscripted into the army however he de-mobilized for health complications. Cogniot was arrested by the German police in 1941 but managed to escape alongside other prisoners and became active in the French Resistance and was responsible for Communist Party press.

In 1944 he once again became editor of L'Humanité and was elected to the National Assembly. A close associate of Maurice Thorez, he was the first director of the Maurice Thorez Institute.

He was part of the Cultural Affairs Committee. In 1966, he was appointed member of the control commission responsible for examining the problems of orientation and selection in the public service of education.

== Works ==
- L'évasion. Récits, Éditions Raisons d'être, 1947
- Proudhon, Éditions de l'Union Française Universitaire
- Rationalisme et laïcité, Les Cahiers rationalistes
- Le Peuple est souverain, Librairie de la Renaissance Française
- De l'enthousiasme à la conscience enchaînée. La question scolaire en 1848 et la loi Falloux, Éditions Hier et Aujourd'hui, 1948
- Hommage à Paul Langevin, texte inclus dans La Pensée et l'Action, les Éditeurs Français Réunis, 1950
- Réalité de la nation, l'attrape-nigaud du cosmopolitisme, Éditions Sociales, 1950
- Petit guide sincère de l'Union Soviétique, Éditions Sociales, 1954
- Conclusions in Mésaventures de l’anti-marxisme – Les malheurs de M. Merleau-Ponty (ouvrage collectif), Paris, Éditions Sociales, 1956; p. 149-157.
- Laïcité et réforme démocratique de l'enseignement, Éditions Sociales, 1963
- Le matérialisme gréco-romain, Éditions Sociales, 1964
- Qu'est-ce que le communisme ?, Éditions Sociales, 1964
- La lyre d'airain : poésie populaire et démocratique, 1815-1918, Éditions Sociales, 1964
- Prométhée s'empare du savoir, la Révolution d'Octobre, la culture et l'école, Éditions Sociales, 1967
- Karl Marx notre contemporain, Éditions Sociales, 1968
- L'Internationale communiste. Aperçu historique, Éditions Sociales, 1969
- Présence de Lénine, Éditions Sociales, 1970
- Maurice Thorez : l'homme, le militant, avec Victor Joannès, Éditions Sociales, 1970
- Parti pris (2 volumes), Éditions Sociales, 1976
- Matérialisme et humanisme : Démocrite, Épicure, Lucrèce, Goethe, Marx, Le Temps des Cerises, 1998
