= Wang Dezhao =

Chinese physicist

Wang Dezhao (Ouang Te-Tchao)
- 汪德昭
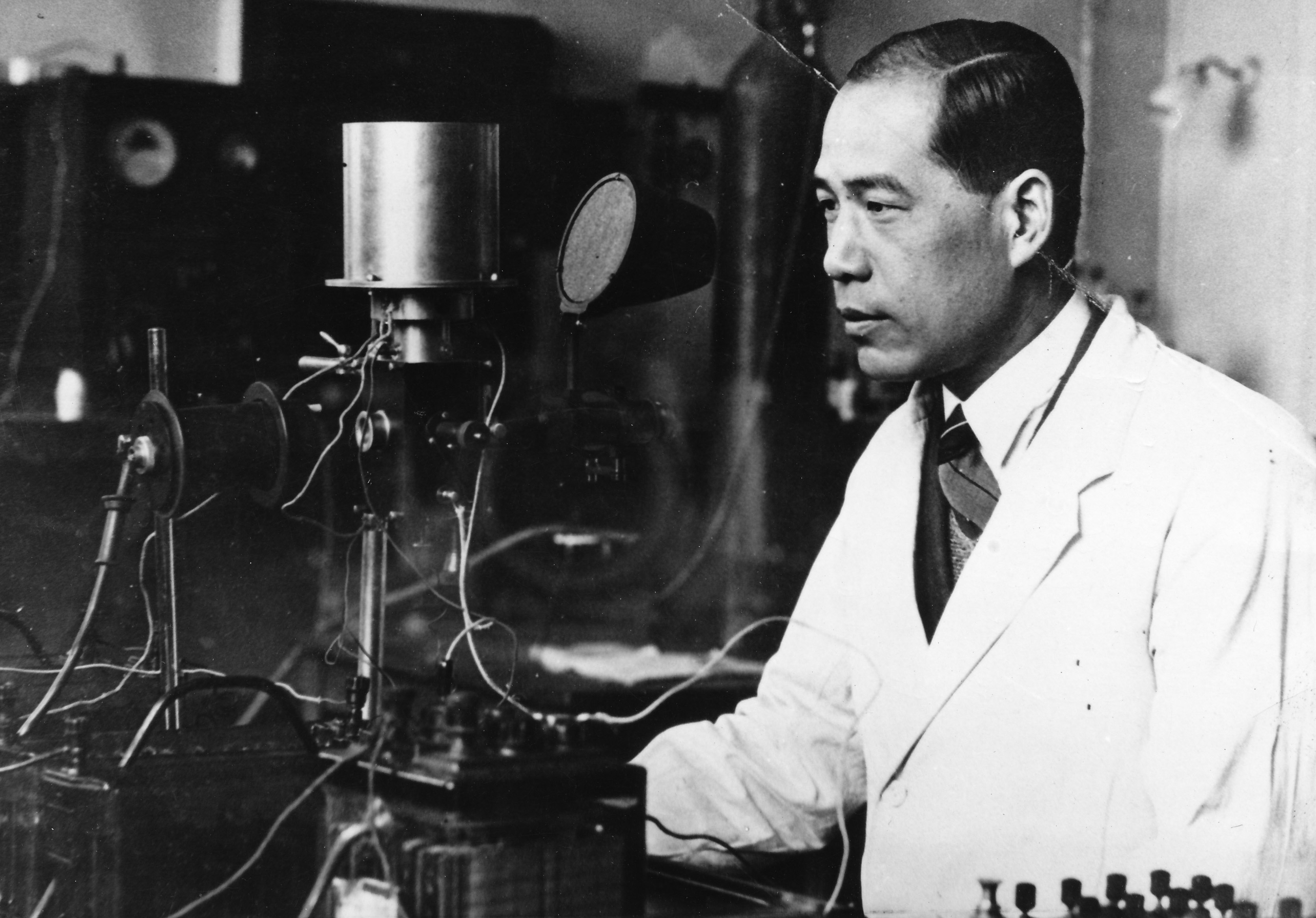
- Born: 20 December 1905; Guanyun, Jiangsu, China
- Died: 28 December 1998 (aged 93); Beijing, China
- Education: Peking Normal University; ESPCI
- Known for: Langevin-Ouang-Biquard theory Sonar Research
- Awards: Prix Hughes (Académie des Sciences, 1945); Médaille étrangère (French Acoustical Society, 1980); Officier de la Légion d'honneur (1992); National Natural Science Award (1982, 1989); Prize for Important Scientific and Technological Achievements (1982); HLHL Prize in Physics (1997)
- Scientific career
- Workplaces: ESPCI, Institute du Radium, CNRS, CEA; Institute of Acoustics, Chinese Academy of Sciences
- Thesis: Electrisation des Particules en Suspension dans les Gaz (1940)
- Doctoral advisors: Paul Langevin

Wang Dezhao or Ouang Te-Tchao (Chinese: 汪德昭; December 20, 1905 – December 28, 1998) was a Chinese physicist who was known for his research in atmospheric electricity and underwater acoustics. Under the direction of Paul Langevin, he helped the French improve sonar at the beginning of World War II and after his return to China, Wang was considered as the founder of national defense water acoustics in China.

== Early life and education ==
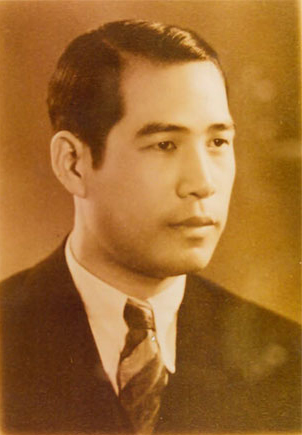
Wang Dezhao, student at Peking Normal University

Wang was born in 1905 in Guanyun, Jiangsu, China to an intellectual family. His father was a graduate of Liangjiang Higher Normal School in Nanjing and later served as a civil servant at the Ministry of Agriculture and Forest of the Republic of China. Wang grew up in Beijing. In 1928, one year before his graduation from the Physics Department of Peking Normal University, he was appointed T.A. by his professor, university president Zhang Yihui who then by the end of 1931, introduced Wang to the prominent French physicist Paul Langevin during his visit to China. This encounter pushed Wang's decision to pursue his studies in France. In 1933, he made the trip to Europe. After one year as a language student at the Université Libre of Bruxelles, he became Langevin's student at École supérieure de physique et de chimie (ESPCI) of Paris where Langevin was the head.

== Career in France ==
Wang was entrusted by Langevin with the research on ionization of particles suspended in the atmosphere, a domain in which Langevin himself had abundantly researched at the turn of the 20th Century for his own doctoral thesis, and in which the world of scientists were increasingly interested for its utility in meteorology and radio-electronics. From 1934 to 1940, Wang published 9 scientific papers and completed the task with his French state doctoral thesis on the Electrization of the Particles Suspended in the gas. Langevin performed a complementary calculation on the results obtained by Wang on a roll of toilet paper when he was secretly imprisoned during 38 days by the Gestapo and then, he reviewed a part of Wang's thesis when he was under house arrest by the end of 1940. Wang's new discoveries on the equilibrium between big and small ions of suspended particles in the gases, as well as the equation he obtained between the numbers of big/small ions and the mobility of small ions, confirmed and completed later by another French scientist J. Bricard in 1948, was referred to as "Langevin-Ouang-Bricard" theory by the geophysical science community in the 1950s.

In 1939, shortly after France and U.K. declared war against Nazi Germany, while all the Langevin laboratories at ESPCI was converted to the Research Group IV of the National Defense Ministry, Wang worked on multiplying the emission power of the ultrasonics submarine detector - known as Sonar today - that Langevin invented by the end of World War I using piezoelectric quartz crystals transducer. Wang succeeded to increase its power per unit area by applying sintering process, which improved greatly the efficiency and the reliability of the active sonar system. The technology was transferred to the UK Royal Navy for immediate implementation. Wang has also succeeded to put together an acoustic system capable of dispersing the heavy fog on military airports by creating large amplitude sound waves using a series of high air pressure Hartmann whistles causing the dispersal of particles suspended in the air.

A profound friendship was built up between Ouang and Langevin beyond their student-teacher relationship. During the World War II, while Langevin was under home arrest, Wang refused to work for ESPCI led by a pro-German director Jean Thibaud and joined Irène and Frédéric Joliot-Curie - also student of Paul Langevin - at their Institute du Radium, where he researched more in radioactivity until the liberation of Paris by allied forces and the return of Langevin to ESPCI. From that point to the middle of 1950s, while continuing the research in ionized gases based on Langevin's theory and his previous work, Wang made breakthroughs in the following domains:

1. Inventing high sensibility electrometers;
2. Measuring the absorption, dispersion and speed of ultrasound in fluid;
3. Proving the existence of negative electrophoresis discovered by Felix Ehrenhaft;
4. Using β ray to measure and control the thickness of emulsion on photo film and paper.

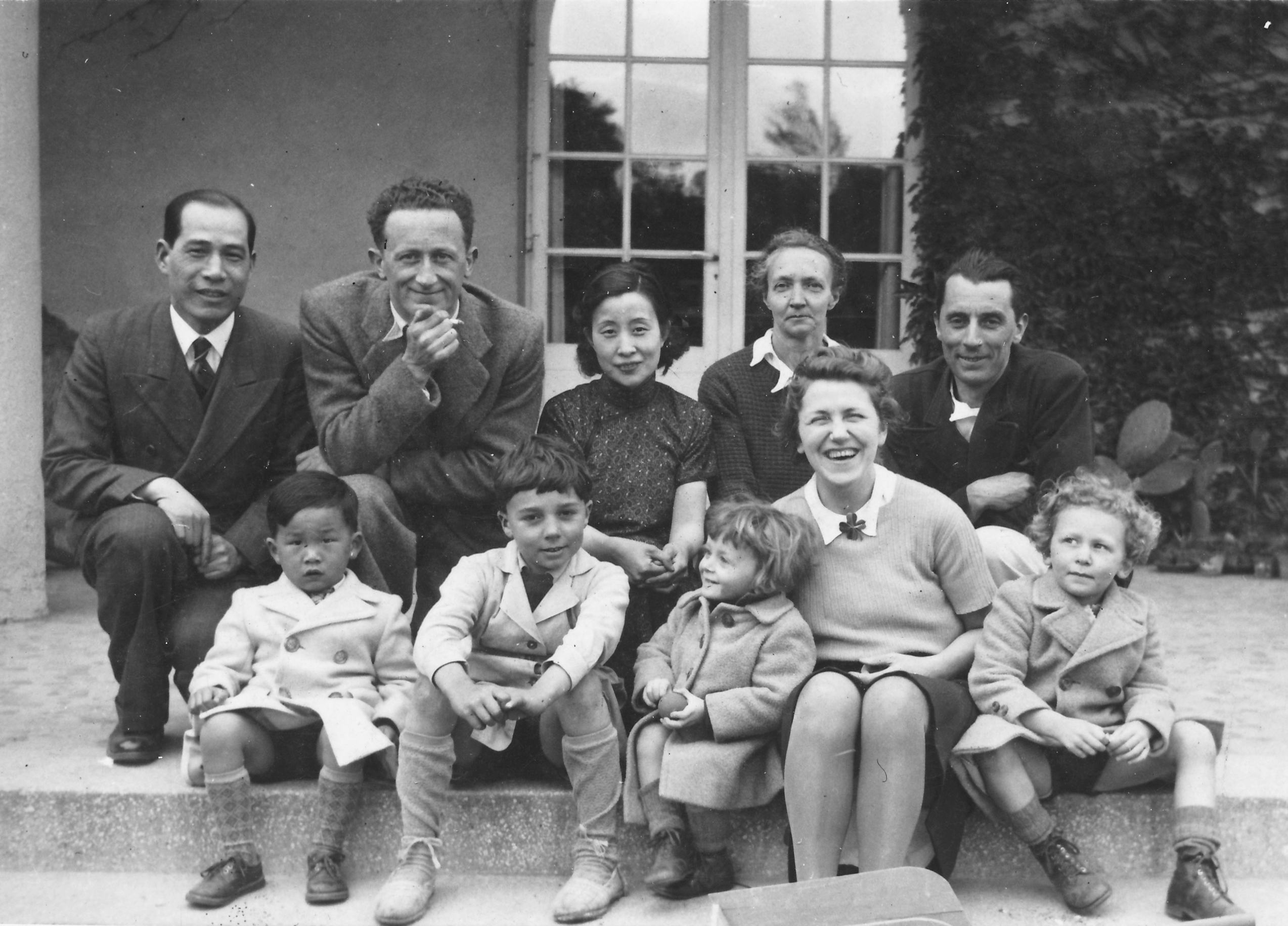
Wang, Joliot-Curie and Biquard families in summer 1941

After the war, Wang was awarded with the Prix Hughes by the Academie des Sciences in 1945 for his contribution in the field of ionized gases; and was promoted by Centre national de la recherche scientifique (CNRS) from researcher to research director. In 1947, by the recommendation of Frédéric Joliot-Curie, he was appointed consultant to the Commisariat à l'Energie Atomique (CEA). He has also been working as scientific consultant for some private companies in France and in the U.K., la Société Quartz and Silice among others.

Influenced by Langevin and Joliot-Curie, both French communist party members, as well as the communist dominant French Resistance movement during the german occupation of the WWII, Wang was also involved in the social life in Paris. In 1949 he was elected president of Association of Chinese students in France - a progressive association regrouping the left-wing Chinese students - disbanded in the fall 1952 by the French government under the global anti-communist waves and at the request of the Republic of China's government withdrawn to Taiwan in the late 1940s.

== Career in China ==
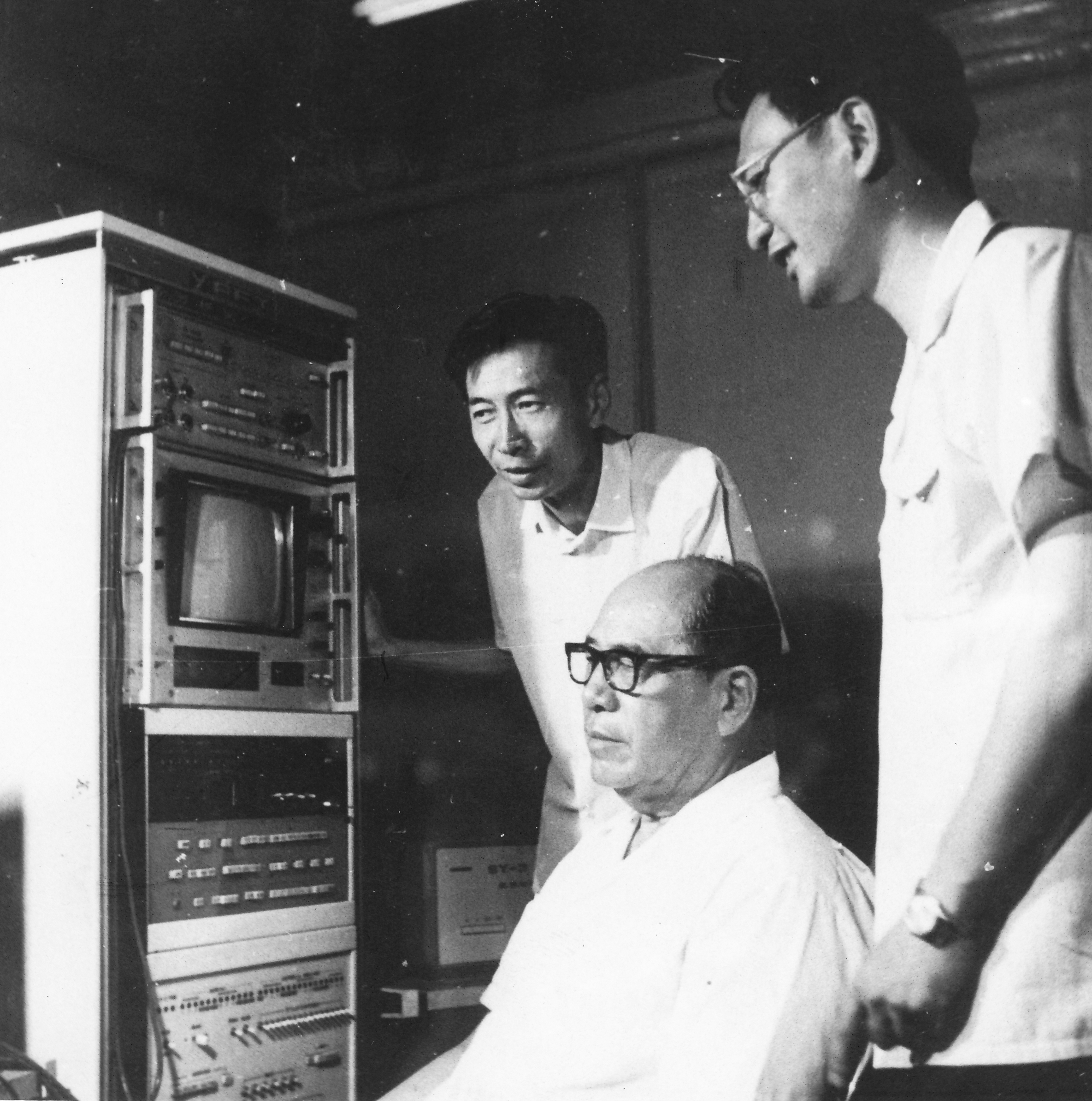
Wang Dezhao and students in the early 1980s.

With his sympathy for the communist movement in China, Wang moved back to People's Republic of China in 1956, seven years after the communists took control and seven years before France formally recognized it. Wang's return to China, as the return of many other western-educated scientists at the same period, was highly anticipated and celebrated by the highest level communist leaders, they saw on him the key to build up a crucial part of the young regime's national defense system - sonar - dubbed as "the underwater great wall". Wang entered the Chinese Academy of Sciences (CAS), where he was elected as academician in 1957, served as associate director of Institute of Electronics in charge of the underwater acoustics research. In 1964, he helped set up the Institute of Acoustics (IOA) and served as its director. Approved by the Chairman Mao Zedong and Premier Zhou Enlai, 100 undergraduate students were picked by CAS even before their graduation from three most prestigious colleges of the time - Peking University, Tsinghua University and Che Kiang University - to form Wang Dezhao's research team. Wang wrote textbooks, trained the young team personally and set the stage for their research career, while leading the experiments on and under the South China Sea.

Wang survived the Culture Revolution (1966-1976) during which the IOA was dismantled, while himself was deprived of all positions and subjected to humiliations, confiscation of property, tortures, custody. After Deng Xiaoping seized power in the aftermath of Mao's era in 1977, Wang wrote a long letter urging Deng to put the IOA and his team back on track. He obtained an immediate favorable response.

Through his retirement in 1984, Wang supported his students to succeed in various basic research subjects, among others:

1. on the normal mode theory;
2. on the theory of horizontal coherence of signal field in shallow water;
3. on the relationship between sound field and bottom-reflection-loss in shallow water;
4. on the theory of turning-point convergence-zones in deep underwater sound channels in the South China Sea;
5. on the effects of internal waves on the underwater sound propagation.

In addition, a series of advanced defense and civil sonar products were also developed. One of the most important was the Bottom-Fixed Underwater Acoustic Surveillance System designed, developed and manufactured by Wang and his students.

Along with scientific papers, Wang has authored with his students English-Chinese, French-Chinese scientific lexicons of acoustical terms and, in 1981, a treatise entitled Underwater Acoustics.

Wang served several terms as representative in China's National People's Congress and as member in standing committee of Chinese People's Political Consultative Conference. In the 1980s, he re-established the Association of Old Students from France and served as Chairman for one term; he also petitioned to create the Middle School affiliated to the Chinese Academy of Sciences, known as Zhongguancun Middle School today, and served as honorific head of school.

== Awards ==
France

- 1945 : Prix Hughes awarded by Académie des Sciences for his research in ionized gases
- 1980 : Médaille étrangère by French Acoustical Society
- 1992 : Officier de la Légion d'honneur awarded by François Mitterrand - Président de la République, decorated by Hubert Curien - Minister of Research

China

- 1982, 1989 : National Natural Science Award
- 1982 : Prize for Important Scientific and Technological Achievements
- 1997 : Ho Leung Ho Lee Prize in Physics
