= Langevin (crater) =

Crater on the Moon

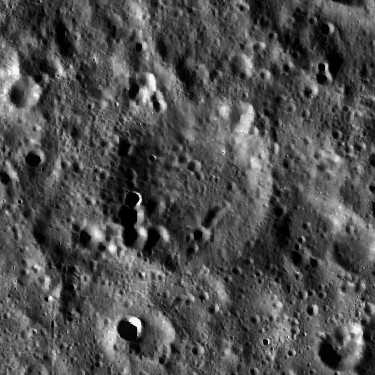
- LRO WAC image
- Coordinates: 44.17°N 162.69°E
- Diameter: 57.80 km (35.92 mi)
- Depth: Unknown
- Colongitude: 198° at sunrise
- Eponym: Paul Langevin

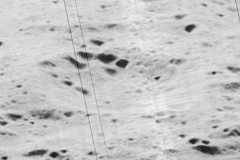
Oblique Lunar Orbiter 5 image, facing west

Langevin is a crater on the far side of the Moon. It is located to the east of the walled plain named Campbell, and to the west of the crater Chandler.

This is a heavily damaged crater that has been worn and battered by multiple overlapping impacts. Apart from the depression Langevin creates in the surface, it is scarcely distinguishable from the surrounding terrain. The outer rim and interior features have lost much of their original definition due to this wear. Multiple small craters lie along the rim, including a cluster along the southwest and a crater along the northeast rim.

Prior to formal naming by the IAU in 1970, Langevin was called Crater 61.

== Satellite craters ==
By convention these features are identified on lunar maps by placing the letter on the side of the crater midpoint that is closest to Langevin.

| Langevin | Latitude | Longitude | Diameter |
|---|---|---|---|
| C | 46.4° N | 165.5° E | 19 km |
