= Éliane Montel =

French physicist and chemist (1898–1993)

Eliane Montel
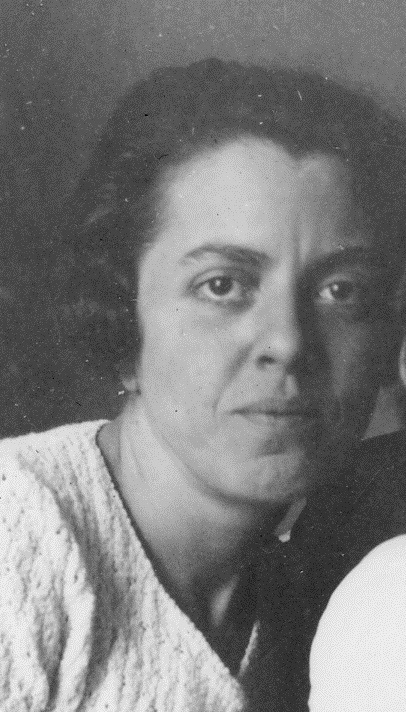
- Born: 8 October 1898; Marseille, France
- Died: 24 January 1993 (aged 94); Paris, France
- Education: École Normale Supérieure de jeunes filles de Sèvres
- Known for: works on radioactivity
- Scientific career
- Fields: Physics, Chemistry, Radioactivity
- Workplaces: ESPCI, Collège de France, Curie Institute

Éliane Montel (8 October 1898 – 24 January 1993) was a French physicist and chemist. Having earned the agrégation teaching qualification in 1923, she joined Marie Curie's laboratory as a voluntary worker in 1926 and continued the following year. In 1931, she joined Paul Langevin in his laboratory and working with his until he died. In 1967, she attended a dinner with former colleagues in connection with Curie's centenary celebrations.

== Family ==
Montel was born on 8 October 1898, in Marseille. She spent her childhood between Marseille and Montpellier.

During the 1920s, Montel had a love affair with French physicist Paul Langevin. Their son, Paul-Gilbert Langevin, was born on 5 July 1933 in Boulogne-Billancourt.

== Early years ==
Montel graduated in 1919 and was a student in sciences at the École Normale Supérieure de jeunes filles de Sèvres. She went on to teach science to young girls, and graduated at the agrégation competition in 1923.

== Professional career ==
In 1926, she began to work as voluntary help in the Curie laboratory at the Institut du radium, under Langevin's recommendations, then as a free worker the next year. She published her work on the penetration of polonium into lead (Sur la pénétration du polonium dans le plomb) in the Journal de physique. While working in Frédéric Joliot-Curie's laboratory at the Collège de France, she acted as a political and scientific intermediary between Langevin and Joliot-Curie, who had been Langevin's former student.

Following her work in the laboratory, she became a physics teacher at a high school in 1929–30. In 1930, Montel obtained a Rothschild scholarship for 1930–1931 through the support of Marie Curie. However, Montel was forced to discontinue her research in order to care for her mother and was not able to complete her research within the year. In 1931–32, she worked as a researcher at the ESPCI, in Paul Langevin's laboratory. Montel stayed with him until he died, in 1946, visiting him while he was under house arrest in Troyes during World War II.

After Langevin's death in 1946, she continued Langevin's research in the same laboratory under René Lucas's direction and worked on gaseous ions mobility measures. She published Langevin's last work, which was realised during World War II when he was in house arrest, on "The device could manage to study the nature of ions and follow its formation and evolution, giving the mobility spectrum". In the following years, she taught physics and chemistry in high school in Fontainebleau, near Paris, until her retirement in the 1960s.

In 1967, Montel attended the Curie laboratory former researchers dinner for Marie Curie's 100th birthday. In 1972, she worked on Langevin's 100th birthday commemoration, publishing texts in his memory in some periodicals and writing a personal text, Langevin et le rationalisme, le savant hors de la tour d'ivoire (Langevin and Rationalism: the Scholar Outside the Ivory Tower) to be published in Scientia. She contributed material to an earlier text in La technique moderne, in the 1930s.

Éliane Montel died in Paris in 1993.

== Works ==
- On penetration of polonium in lead, Review of physics and radium, 1929.
- Paul Langevin, the great masters of Science, Modern Technics, 1935.
- On mobility and diffusion of ions, in Reports of the sessions from the French Academy of Sciences, 1939.
- On a new method to measure gaseous ions mobility, in Reports of the sessions from the French Academy of Sciences.
- Action of 204Tl and 90Sr β-rays on ordinary photographic records, with Ouang Te Tchao, in Reports of the sessions from the French Academy of Sciences, 1946.
- On the Paul Langevin analyzer for the research on gaseous ions mobility, with Ouang Te Tchao, Review of physics and radium, 1949.
- On a high sensibility monofilar electrometer, Review of physics and radium, 1954.
- A Tribute to Paul Langevin, with René Lucas, 1972.
- Langevin and rationalism, the scientist outside the ivory tower, Scientia, 1973.

== See also ==
- Paul Langevin
- Marie Curie
- Frédéric Joliot-Curie
- Paul-Gilbert Langevin
- List of women associated with Marie Curie and Irène Joliot-Curie
