= Pierre Vidal (composer) =

French composer, organist, and musicologist

Pierre Daniel Vidal (27 April 1927 – 5 February 2010) was a French composer, organist, and musicologist.

== Biography ==
Born in Clichy, Vidal was an autodidact. At the age of 16, he had piano and organ lessons with Marcel Dupré for 4 years. Then he followed the lessons by Henri Challan in harmony at the Conservatoire de Paris. He read a lot of good books about classical music, especially those by Albert Schweitzer and Boris de Schloezer. He became a specialist by hearing the recordings of Wilhelm Furtwängler, Willem Mengelberg, Karl Münchinger and Helmut Walcha. He was at the concerts by Wanda Landowska and André Marchal. André Jorrand became one of his pupils. From 1946 to 1970, he was the organist of Saint-Jean-Baptiste de Belleville church. Following the advice of Michel Chapuis, he became an organ teacher at the Conservatoire de Strasbourg in 1967.

He died in Mersuay at the age of 82.

== Recordings ==
His recordings and his books follow the same line about organ music. The recordings are played in Notre-Dame-des-Blancs-Manteaux in Paris, in Saint-Maximin in Thionville and in Saint-Andreas d'Hildesheim. A complete discography has been edited by Alain Carteyrade on France Orgue.

== Publications ==
- Bach et la machine orgue (1973) Stil.
- Bach, les Psaumes; Passions, images et structures dans l’œuvre d’orgue (1977) Stil.
- L'origine thématique de « L'Art de la fugue » (1984) La flûte de Pan.
- Musiciens d'Europe, directed by Paul-Gilbert Langevin, la Revue Musicale, Paris, 1986 (contribution).

== See also ==
- Alain Pâris, Dictionnaire des interprètes et de l’interprétation musicale au XXème siècle, Paris, Éditions Robert Laffont, 1995.
