= Institute of Acoustics, Chinese Academy of Sciences =

Chinese research institute

The Institute of Acoustics (IOA, Chinese: 中国科学院声学研究所) of the Chinese Academy of Sciences (CAS) was established in 1964 by the Chinese government in the context of China's national defense needs for acoustic research, under the auspices of Marshall Nie Rongzhen.

By the end of 2017, the IOA counts more than 700 researchers focusing on the study of basic and applied acoustics, in the following fields:

1. Underwater acoustics and underwater acoustical detection;
2. Environmental acoustics and noise control technologies;
3. Ultrasonics and acoustical micro-electromechanical system technologies;
4. Communication acoustics, language/speech information processing; Integration of acoustics with digital systems, and network new media technologies.

Seven academicians of the Chinese Academy of Sciences have been elected from the IOA, they were/are: Wang Dezhao, Ma Dayou, Ying Chongfu, Zhang Renhe, Hou Chaohuan, Li Qihu, Wang Chenghao.

IOA is the de facto sponsor of the Acoustical Society of China (ASC), a nongovernmental organization officially affiliated to China Association for Science and Technology.

In 2012, the ASC co-hosted with the Acoustical Society of America a joint meeting in Hong Kong. In 2014, the IOA hosted the International Congress on Sound and Vibration in Beijing. In 2015, the IOA co-hosted with The French Acoustics Society The 9th International Conference Auditorium Acoustics in Paris. And according to the IOA official web site, it will co-host with the ASC an International Congress on Ultrasonics in 2021.

The IOA publishes 7 academic journals, among others, Acta Acustica (incl. English version) and Applied Acoustics.
