= Roger Dajoz =

French biologist, ecologist, and entomologist (1929–2019)

Roger Dajoz (22 August 1929 – 10 March 2019) was a French biologist, ecologist and entomologist.

== Biography ==
He was former student of the Ecole Normale Supérieure and a teacher at the Museum national d'histoire naturelle in Paris. He specialised in the insects that feed on rotting wood and gave the term saproxylic insects in 1966 and has been considered the father of saproxylic entomology. Most of his writings were in French.

He published a number of books on ecology, entomology and biology. One of the most important is an Ecology dictionary named Précis d'écologie, published by Dunod in French.

== Publications ==
- Insecticides, PUF, 1959.
- Wood-boring insects and their part in deadwood degradation in Forest ecology, Gauthier-Villars, 1974.
- Ecology collection, vol.6, Population dynamics, Masson, 1974.
- The ecology encyclopedia : the present in question, with other contributors, Larousse, 1977.
- Ecology dictionary, Dunod, 2006.
- Biodiversity, the future of man and the planet, Ellipses, 2009.
- Biologic evolution in the 21st century, facts and theories, Lavoisier, 2012.
