= Paul-Gilbert Langevin =

French musicologist (1933–1986)

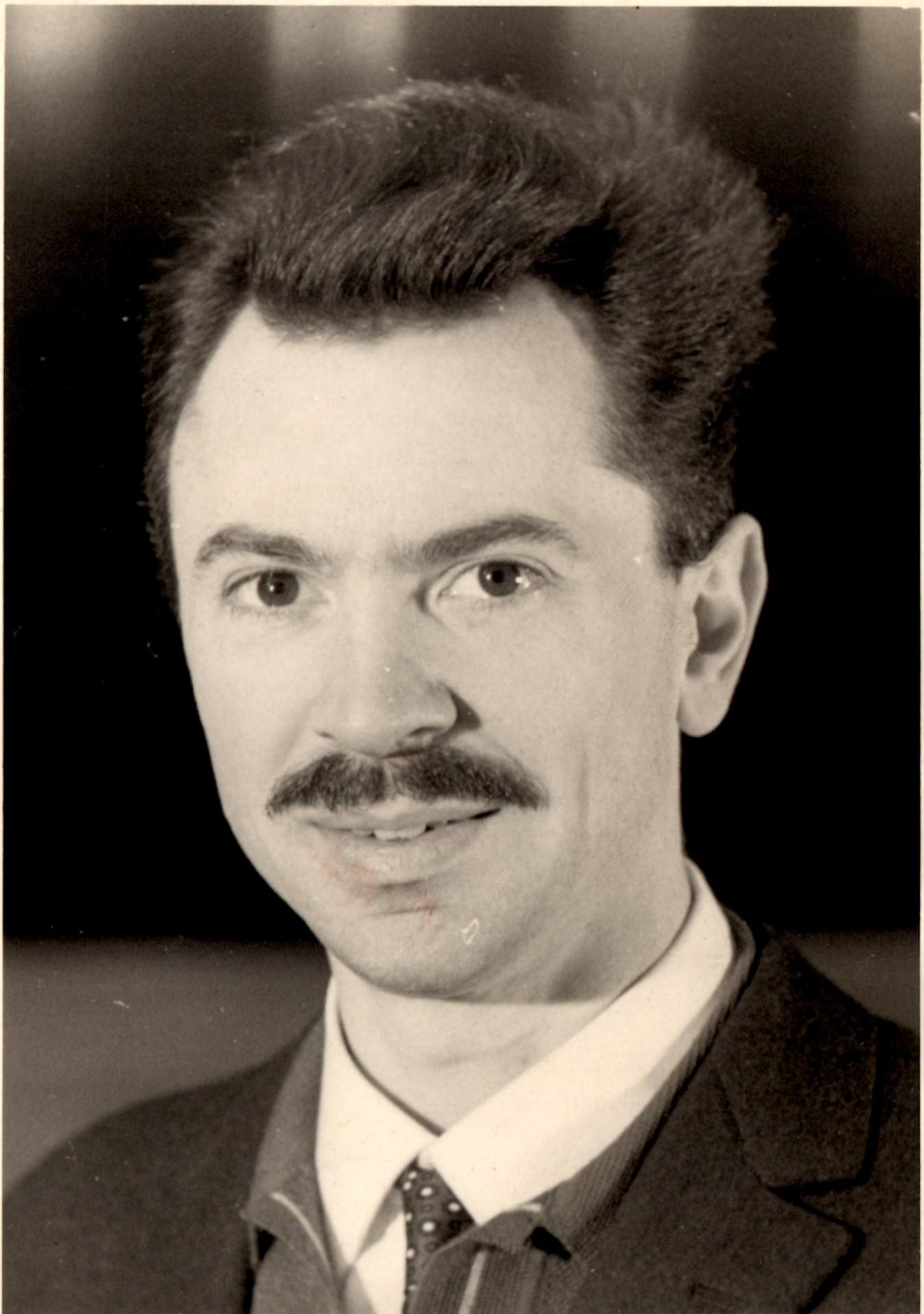
- Born: 5 July 1933; Boulogne-Billancourt, France
- Died: 4 July 1986 (aged 52); Paris, France
- Education: ESPCI, Sorbonne, Centre Universitaire de Vincennes
- Scientific career
- Fields: Musicology, classical music, symphonic music, physical chemistry
- Workplaces: Sorbonne, Université Pierre-et-Marie-Curie, Anton Bruckner french society

Paul-Gilbert Langevin (Boulogne-Billancourt, 5 July 1933 – Paris, 4 July 1986) was a French musicologist, who was a specialist on Anton Bruckner, Franz Schubert and 19th-century classical music.

== History ==
Paul-Gilbert Langevin was the son of French physicist Paul Langevin (1872–1946) and Éliane Montel (1898–1993), a private teacher at the Sorbonne science department. He started his scientific education at the Sorbonne and then completed it at the Université Pierre-et-Marie-Curie, obtaining a degree in physical chemistry under the supervision of professor René Freymann.

From a young age, Langevin had a deep interest in classical music, listening to Anton Bruckner's symphonies on radio recordings during his youth and meeting conductor Roberto Benzi. Having completed his scientific degrees, he decided to write a thesis under the supervision of Daniel Charles at the Centre Universitaire de Vincennes about 19th century Austrian music, focusing on composer Anton Bruckner and the so-called ethnoromantic period.

He became a physics teacher at the Sorbonne science department, and then, at the Université Pierre-et-Marie-Curie, which was created in 1971. During this time, he met musicologists Harry Halbreich, Gustav Kars (father of Jean-Rodolphe Kars), Jacques Feschotte, Pierre Vidal, Marc Vignal and Jean-Luc Caron. Langevin went on to create the Anton Bruckner French society, wrote books on 19th-century symphonic music, edited in La Revue Musicale and L'Age d'Homme, and became a music critic in Le Monde de la musique, edited by Anne Rey.

From the 1950s, Langevin focused on classical music, symphonic music, and writing. Specifically, he wrote articles, monographs and books about Anton Bruckner, Franz Schubert, Guillaume Lekeu, Albéric Magnard, Joseph-Guy Ropartz and Charles Koechlin. He was also interested in works by Hugo Wolf, Gustav Mahler, Arnold Schoenberg, Franz Schmidt, Ferruccio Busoni, Leoš Janáček and Carl Nielsen.

Paul-Gilbert Langevin died in Paris on 4 July 1986.

== Bibliography ==
- Le siècle de Bruckner, La Revue Musicale, N°298/299, 1975. (ISSN 0768-1593)
- Anton Bruckner, apogée de la symphonie, L'Âge d'Homme, 1977. (ISBN 978-2-8251-0880-2)
- Musiciens de France, La Revue Musicale, N°324/326, 1979. (ISSN 0768-1593)
- Anton Bruckner et l'ethnoromantisme autrichien, PhD thesis, 1980.
- Franz Schubert et la symphonie, La Revue Musicale, N°355/357, 1982. (ISSN 0768-1593)
- Musiciens d'Europe, La Revue Musicale, N°388/390, 1986. (ISSN 0768-1593)
- Anton Bruckner, perspective esthétique et étude analytique en relation avec les éditions critiques, PhD thesis, 1974.
- Traité de musicologie, directed by Jacques Chailley, PUF, contribution, 1958.
- Encyclopédie des musiques sacrées, directed by Jacques Porte, contribution, 1971.
- Larousse de la musique, directed by Marc Vignal, contribution, 1982. (ISBN 2-03-511304-0)
