= Henri Manuel =

French photographer (1874–1947)

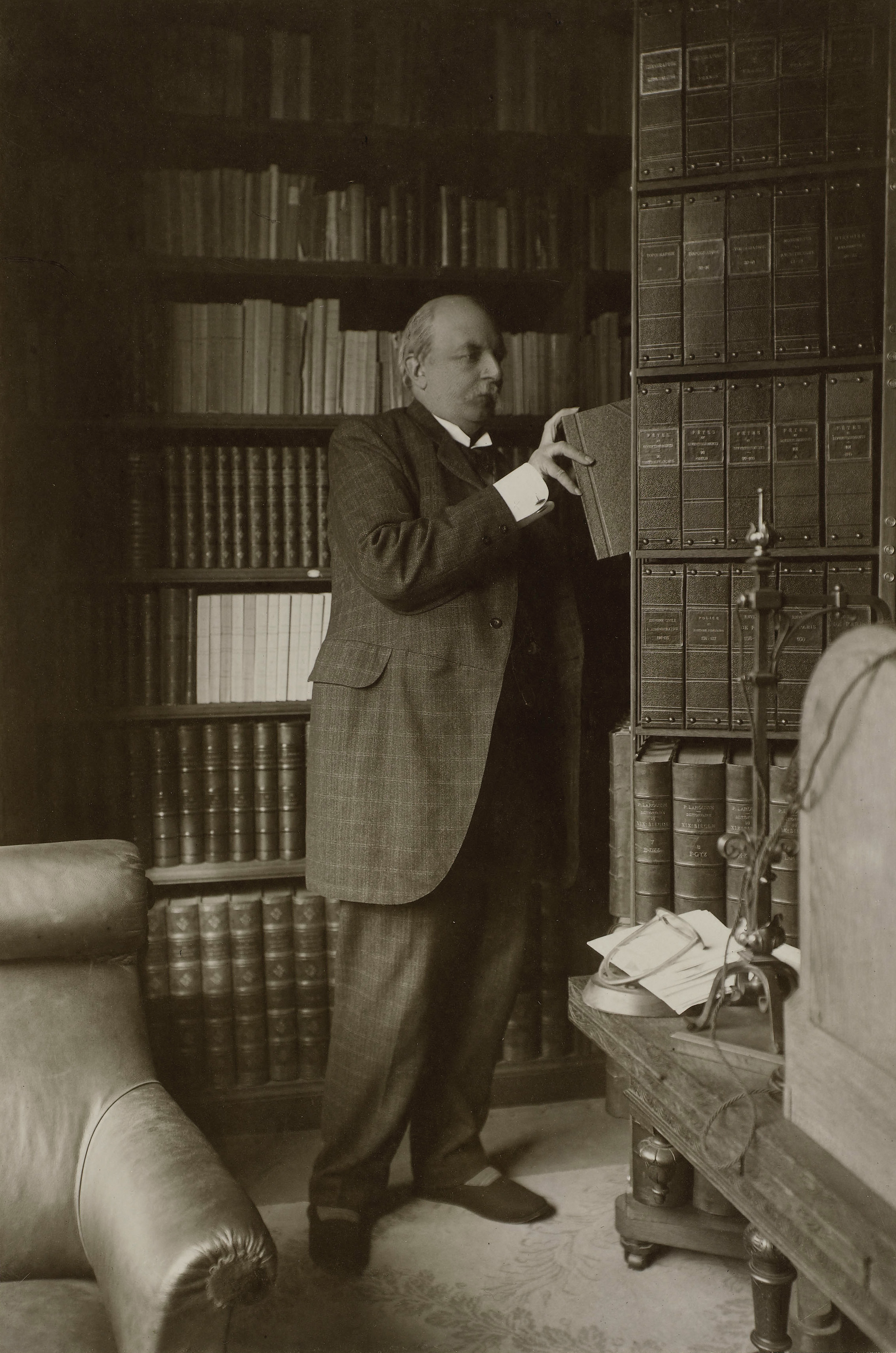
Henri Manuel, 1940s

Henri Manuel (24 April 1874 – 11 September 1947) was a French photographer who served as the official photographer of the French government from 1914 to 1944.

== Photography studio ==
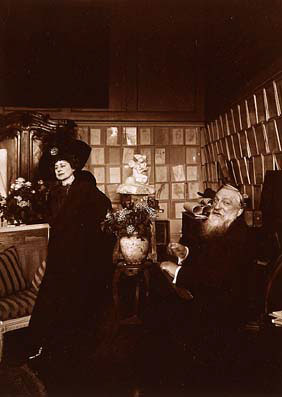
Henri Manuel's photograph of Auguste Rodin and the Duchesse de Choiseul at the Hôtel Biron

In 1900, Manuel opened a portrait studio in Paris with his brother Gaston, which specialised in portrait photography. Manuel quickly became renowned as a photographer of people from the worlds of politics, art and sports, as well as a photographer of art and architecture. Soon his portraits were used by news agencies, and in 1910 Manuel's studio began providing a commercial service to news agencies for photographs known as "l'Agence universelle de reportage Henri Manuel".

The studio became the largest photographic studio in Paris and a leading centre where young aspiring photographers such as Thérèse Bonney might go to work. In 1925, the brothers moved their business to 27 rue du Faubourg Montmartre, where they expanded their business into fashion photography for the likes of Chanel, Patou, Poiret and Lanvin. By 1941 the studio had produced over a million images, spread between fashion photographs, news agency photographs, personal portraits and other images.

The studio was shut down during the Second World War, and most of the photographic plates were destroyed. Some 500 survived, and ultimately passed into possession of the Médiathèque de l'architecture et du patrimoine.
