= Hélène Solomon-Langevin =

French politician (1909–1995)

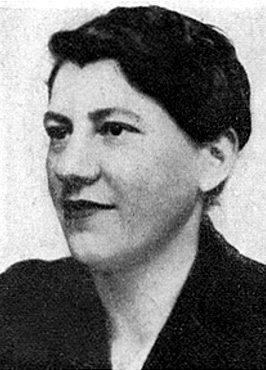
- Solomon-Langevin in 1945

Member of the National Assembly
- In office 1945–1946
- Constituency: Seine

Personal details
- Born: 25 May 1909 Fontenay-aux-Roses, France
- Died: 16 January 1995 (aged 85) Sens, France

Hélène Solomon-Langevin (25 May 1909 – 16 January 1995) was a French politician. She was elected to the National Assembly in 1945 as one of the first group of French women in parliament.

== Biography ==
Solomon-Langevin was born in Fontenay-aux-Roses in 1909, the daughter of physicist Paul Langevin. She married Jacques Solomon, who began working with his new father-in-law. Both men were involved in the French Communist Party (PCF) and Solomon-Langevin became a member of the World Committee of Women against War and Fascism. Having become members of the French Resistance, the couple were both arrested during 1942; Jacques was killed by firing squad in May, while Hélène was imprisoned in the Fort de Romainville. She was transferred to Auschwitz concentration camp in January 1943 in Convoi des 31000, and was later moved to the Raisko satellite camp and then Ravensbrück and Sachsenhausen, from which she was liberated in 1945.

She was a PCF candidate in Seine's first district in the October 1945 elections to the National Assembly. Placed third on the PCF list, she was one of 33 women elected, and became a member of the National Education Commission. She was re-elected in the June 1946 elections, but did not run for re-election in the November 1946 elections due to poor health.

Solomon-Langevin began working part-time as a librarian at the French National Centre for Scientific Research in 1948, becoming a full-time employee in 1952. In 1958 she married André Parreaux, an academic and the couple adopted a daughter, Michèle Norel. She died in Sens in 1995.
