= Paul Langevin =

French physicist (1872–1946)

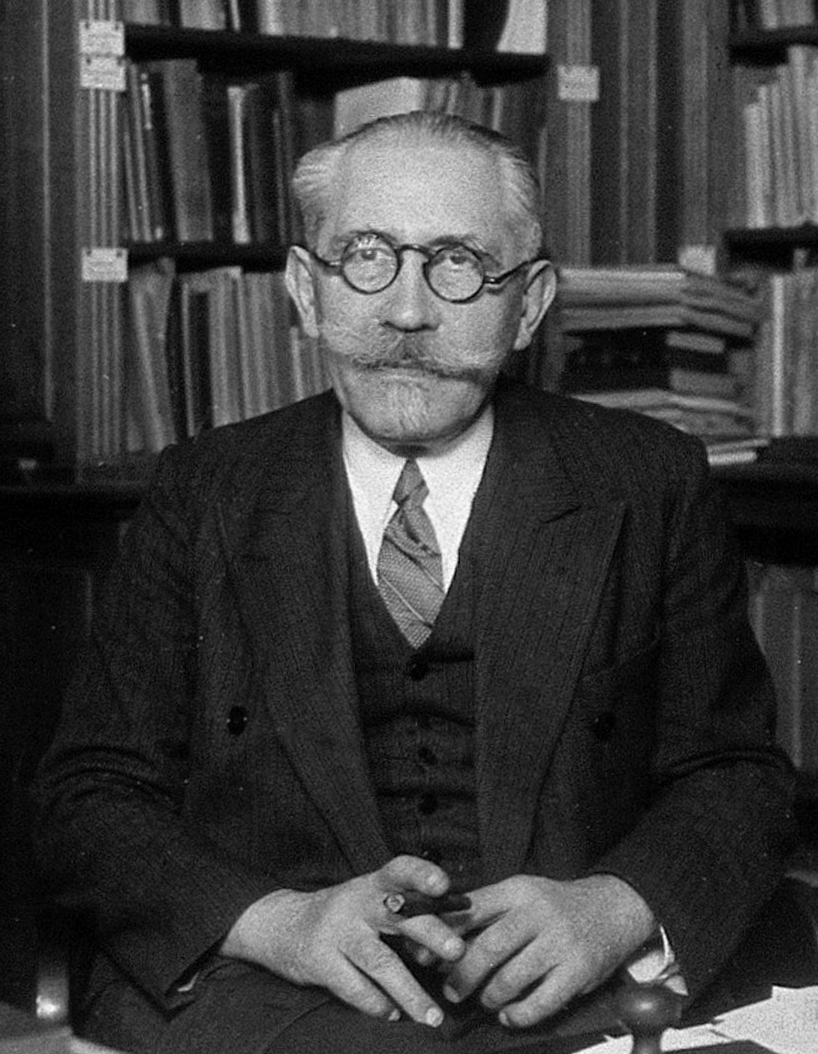
- Photograph of Langevin by Henri Manuel
- Born: 23 January 1872; Paris, France
- Died: 19 December 1946 (aged 74); Paris, France
- Education: ESPCI Paris: Lic., Physics; ENS Paris University of Paris: Dr ès sc., Physics
- Known for: Langevin diamagnetism; Langevin dynamics; Langevin equation; Brillouin and Langevin functions; Twin paradox; Sonar
- Spouse: Emma Jeanne Desfosses (m. 1898)
- Children: 4, including Hélène and Paul-Gilbert
- Awards: Hughes Medal (1915); Copley Medal (1940)
- Scientific career
- Fields: Physics
- Workplaces: ESPCI Paris; ENS Sèvres; Collège de France
- Thesis: Recherches sur les gaz ionisés (1902)
- Doctoral advisor: Pierre Curie
- Doctoral students: Léon Brillouin; Louis de Broglie

Paul Langevin (French: [pɔl lɑ̃ʒvɛ̃]; 23 January 1872 – 19 December 1946) was a French physicist who developed Langevin dynamics and the Langevin equation. He was one of the founders of the Comité de vigilance des intellectuels antifascistes, an anti-fascist organization created after the 6 February 1934 far right riots. Being a public opponent of fascism in the 1930s resulted in his arrest and being held under house arrest by the Vichy government for most of World War II. Langevin was also president of the Human Rights League (LDH) from 1944 to 1946, having recently joined the French Communist Party.

He was a doctoral student of Pierre Curie and later a lover of widowed Marie Curie. He is also known for his two US patents with Constantin Chilowsky in 1916 and 1917 involving ultrasonic submarine detection. He is entombed at the Panthéon.

== Biography ==
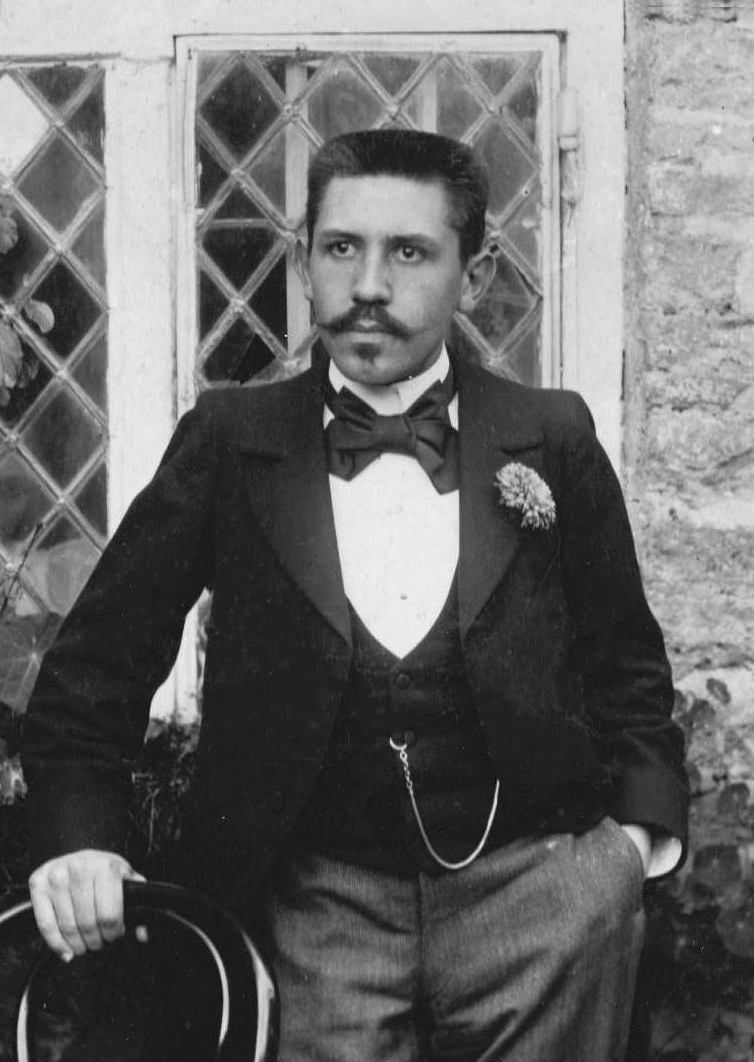
Langevin in 1897

Paul Langevin was born on 23 January 1872 in Paris, France, the only child of Marie Adèle (née Pinel) and Victor Charles Langevin. In 1888, he entered ESPCI Paris, graduating in 1892 with a licentiate in Physics. He studied at École normale supérieure de Paris from 1894 to 1897, and passed the agrégation in 1897. In 1898, he went to England to study in the Cavendish Laboratory at the University of Cambridge. (Note: He may not have been formally entered as a member of the university, as he is not found in John Venn's Alumni Cantabrigienses.) In 1901, he became an assistant in the Physics Teaching Laboratory at the University of Paris, where he received a Doctor of Science in 1902 for a thesis on the ionisation of gases.

From 1903 to 1905, Langevin was an assistant to Pierre Curie at ESPCI Paris, where he became a professor in 1905 and Director of Studies in 1908. He was also a lecturer at École normale supérieure de Sèvres from 1905 to 1933. In 1909, Langevin was appointed to the Chair of General and Experimental Physics at the Collège de France, where he remained until his death in 1946.

== Research ==
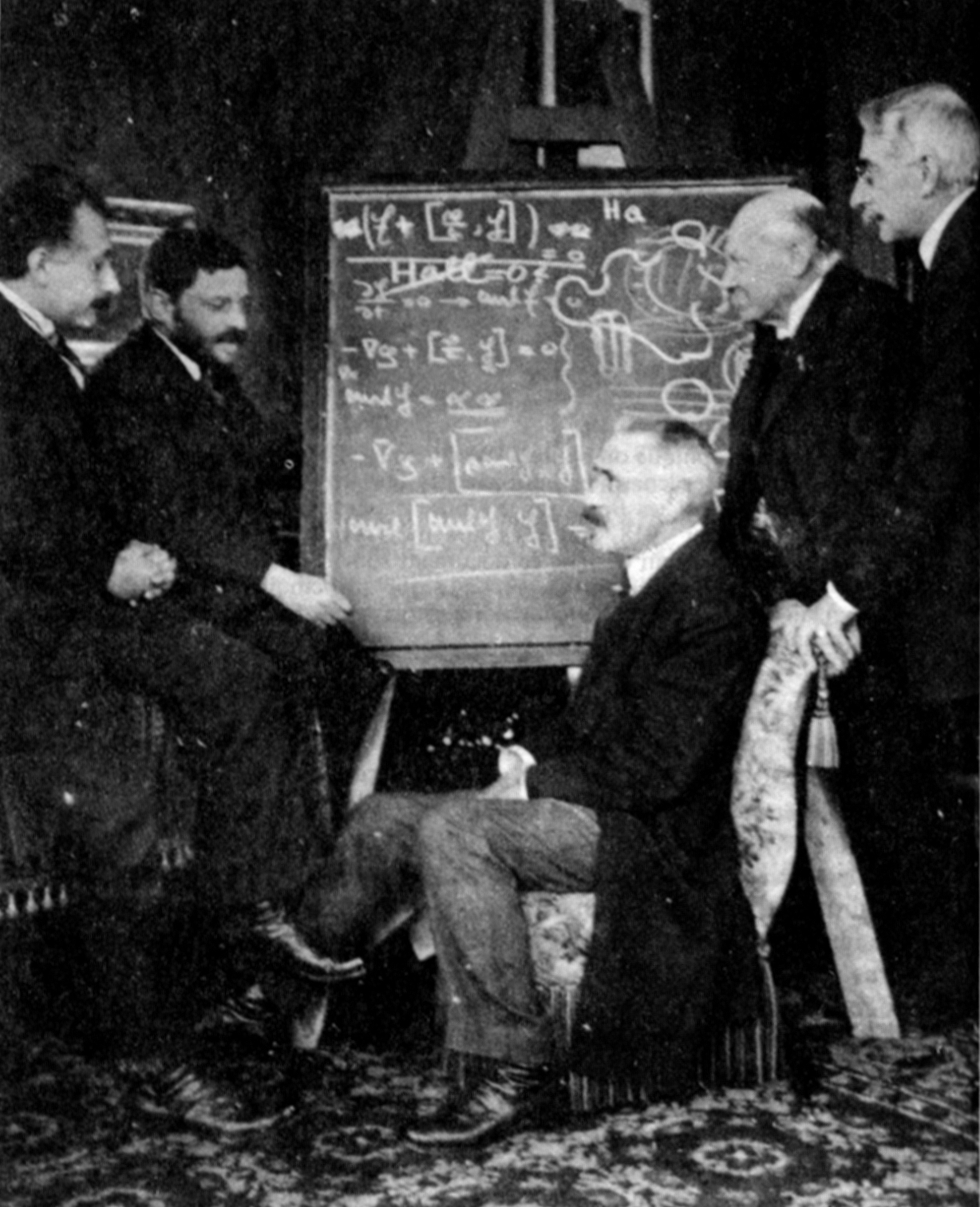
Albert Einstein, Paul Ehrenfest, Paul Langevin, Heike Kamerlingh Onnes, and Pierre Weiss at Ehrenfest's home in Leiden in the Netherlands

Langevin is noted for his work on paramagnetism and diamagnetism, and devised the modern interpretation of this phenomenon in terms of electron spin. His most famous work was in the use of ultrasound using Pierre Curie's piezoelectric effect. During World War I, he began working on the use of these sounds to detect submarines through echo location, though the war ended before the system became operational. During his career, Paul Langevin also spread the theory of relativity in academic circles in France and created what is now called the twin paradox.

== Personal life ==
In 1898, Langevin married Emma Jeanne Desfosses. They had two sons, Jean and André, and one daughter, Hélène, who became one of the first women in France to be elected to the National Assembly.

In 1910, he had an affair with the then-widowed Marie Curie; some decades later, their respective grandchildren, grandson Michel Langevin and granddaughter Hélène Langevin-Joliot married one another. He was also noted for being an outspoken opponent of Nazism, and was removed from his post by the Vichy government following the occupation of the country by Nazi Germany. He was later restored to his position in 1944. He died in Paris in 1946, two years after living to see the Liberation of Paris. He is buried near several other prominent French scientists in the Panthéon in Paris.

In 1933, he had a son with physicist Éliane Montel (1898–1993), Paul-Gilbert Langevin, who became a renowned musicologist.

His daughter, Hélène Solomon-Langevin, was arrested for Resistance activity and survived several concentration camps. She was on the same convoy of female political prisoners as Marie-Claude Vaillant-Couturier and Charlotte Delbo.

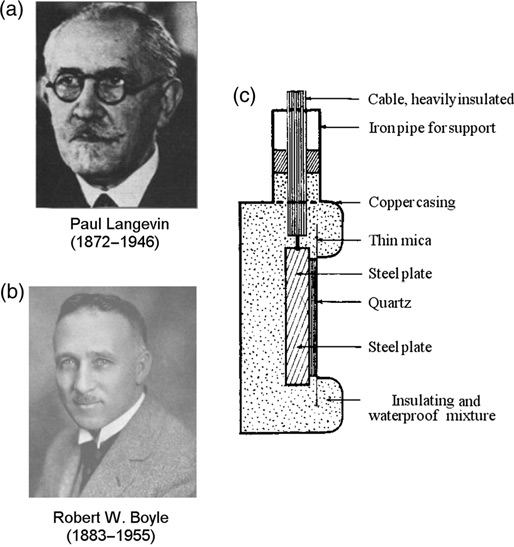
Pioneers in the development and application of piezoelectric transducers for the goal of submarine detection (a) Paul Langevin, (b) Robert William Boyle, (c) Cross-sectional view of a form of quartz transducer designed by Boyle in 1917, as recorded in the BIR (Board of Invention and Research) document 38164/17

== Submarine detection ==
In 1916 and 1917, Paul Langevin and Chilowsky filed two US patents disclosing the first ultrasonic submarine detector using an electrostatic method (singing condenser) for one patent and thin quartz crystals for the other. The amount of time taken by the signal to travel to the enemy submarine and echo back to the ship on which the device was mounted was used to calculate the distance under water.

In 1916, Lord Ernest Rutherford, working in the UK with his former McGill University PhD student Robert William Boyle, revealed that they were developing a quartz piezoelectric detector for submarine detection. Langevin's successful application of the use of piezoelectricity in the generation and detection of ultrasound waves was followed by further development.

== Recognition ==
=== Awards ===
Year	Organisation	Award	Citation	Ref.
1915	Royal Society	Hughes Medal	"For his important contributions to, and pre-eminent position in, electrical science."	
1940	Royal Society	Copley Medal	"For his pioneer work on the electron theory of magnetism, his fundamental contributions to discharge of electricity in gases, and his important work in many branches of theoretical physics."	

=== Memberships ===
Year	Organisation	Type	Ref.
1928	Royal Society	Foreign Member	
1934	French Academy of Sciences	Member	

== See also ==
- Born coordinates, for the Langevin observers in relativistic physics
- History of the twin paradox
- Langevin dynamics
- Langevin equation
- Langevin function
- Brillouin and Langevin functions
- Solvay Conference
- Brownian motion
- Special relativity
- Institut Laue–Langevin
- History of ESPCI Paris

== Sources ==
- Asimov's Biographical Encyclopedia of Science and Technology, Isaac Asimov, Doubleday & Co., Inc., 1972, ISBN 0-385-17771-2.
- References to the affair with Marie Curie is found in Françoise Giroud (Davis, Lydia trans.), Marie Curie: A life, Holmes and Meier, 1986, ISBN 0-8419-0977-6, and in Quinn Susan, Marie Curie: A Life, Heinemann, 1995, ISBN 0-434-60503-4.
- Wolfram research biographical entry Archived 14 September 2020 at the Wayback Machine by Michel Barran.
- Annotated bibliography for Niels Bohr from the Alsos Digital Library for Nuclear Issues
