= European Spallation Source =

Multi-disciplinary research facility in Lund, Sweden

Coordinates: 55.7350°N 13.2514°E

European Spallation Source ERIC
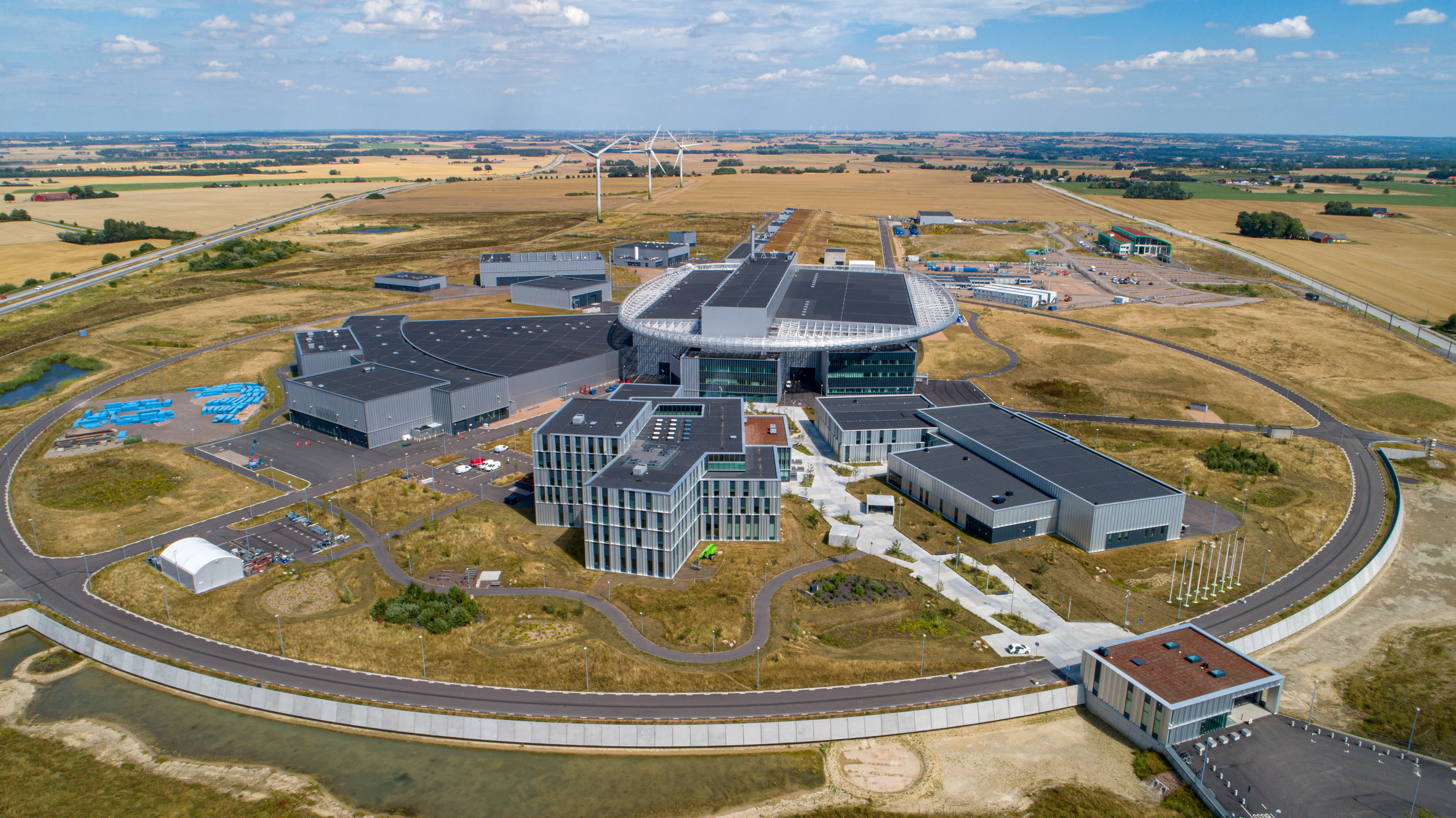
- Scientific Purpose: Provide unique information about the structure and properties of materials across the spectrum of biology, chemistry, physics, and engineering.
- Location: Lund, Sweden
- Proposer: ERIC
- Project website: ess.eu
- Status: Under construction
- Type: Research Laboratories
- Start date: 2013
- Completion date: 2027

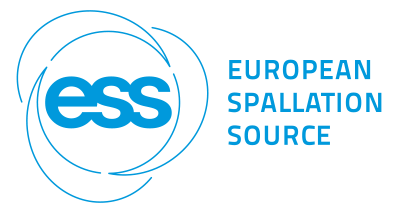
ESS logo

The European Spallation Source ERIC (ESS) is a multi-disciplinary research facility currently under construction in Lund, Sweden. Its Data Management and Software Centre (DMSC) is co-located with DTU in Lyngby, Denmark. Its 13 European contributor countries (Czech Republic, Denmark, Estonia, France, Germany, Hungary, Italy, Norway, Poland, Spain, Sweden, Switzerland and the United Kingdom) are partners in the construction and operation of the ESS. The ESS is scheduled to begin its scientific user program in 2027, when the construction phase is set to be completed. The ESS will assist scientists from the partner countries in the tasks of determining and understanding basic atomic and magnetic structures and the associated dynamic atomic and magnetic properties, which are more challenging to probe with other neutron sources in terms of lengths and time scales. The research facility is located near the MAX IV Laboratory, which conducts complementary synchrotron radiation research. The construction of the ESS facility began in the summer of 2014 and the first science results are planned for 2027.

During operation, the ESS will use nuclear spallation, a process in which neutrons are liberated from heavy elements by high energy protons. This is considered to be a safer process than uranium fission since the reaction requires an external energy supply which can be stopped easily. Furthermore, spallation produces more usable neutrons for a given amount of waste heat than fission. The ESS facility is an example of a "long-pulse" source (milliseconds).. By contrast, other large-scale spallation sources ISIS, SNS, China Spallation Neutron Source and J-PARC are examples of "short-pulse" sources. The unique long-pulse nature of the ESS, in combination with the very large peak brilliance of the resulting neutron beam is expected to facilitate experiments that have not been possible at existing sources, e.g. because the signals of interest are too weak, the available sample sizes are too small, or the time-scales of interest are too short.

The ESS facility consists of a linear accelerator, in which protons are accelerated to relativistic speeds and then allowed to collide with a rotating, helium-cooled tungsten target wheel, generating intense pulses of neutrons. Located above the tungsten wheel are baths of cryogenic hydrogen and water at room temperature. High-energy neutrons released from tungsten nuclei in the spallation process lose most of their energy by inelastic collisions inside the hydrogen and water moderators and come into thermal equilibrium at the temperatures of these media. The cold and thermal neutrons emanating from the surface of the moderators feed neutron supermirror guides. The guides operate similarly to optical fibres, directing the beams of neutrons to experimental stations, where research is performed on a range of materials.

Neutron scattering can be applied to a range of scientific explorations in physics, chemistry, geology, biology, and medicine. Neutrons serve as a probe for revealing the structure and function of matter from the microscopic down to the atomic scale, with the potential for development of new materials and processes.

During construction, the ESS became a European Research Infrastructure Consortium, or ERIC, on 1 October 2015.

The European Investment Bank made a €50 million investment in the ESS. This investment is supported by InnovFin-EU Finance for Innovators, an initiative established by the EIB Group in collaboration with the European Commission under Horizon 2020, the EU's research and innovation program.

== History ==
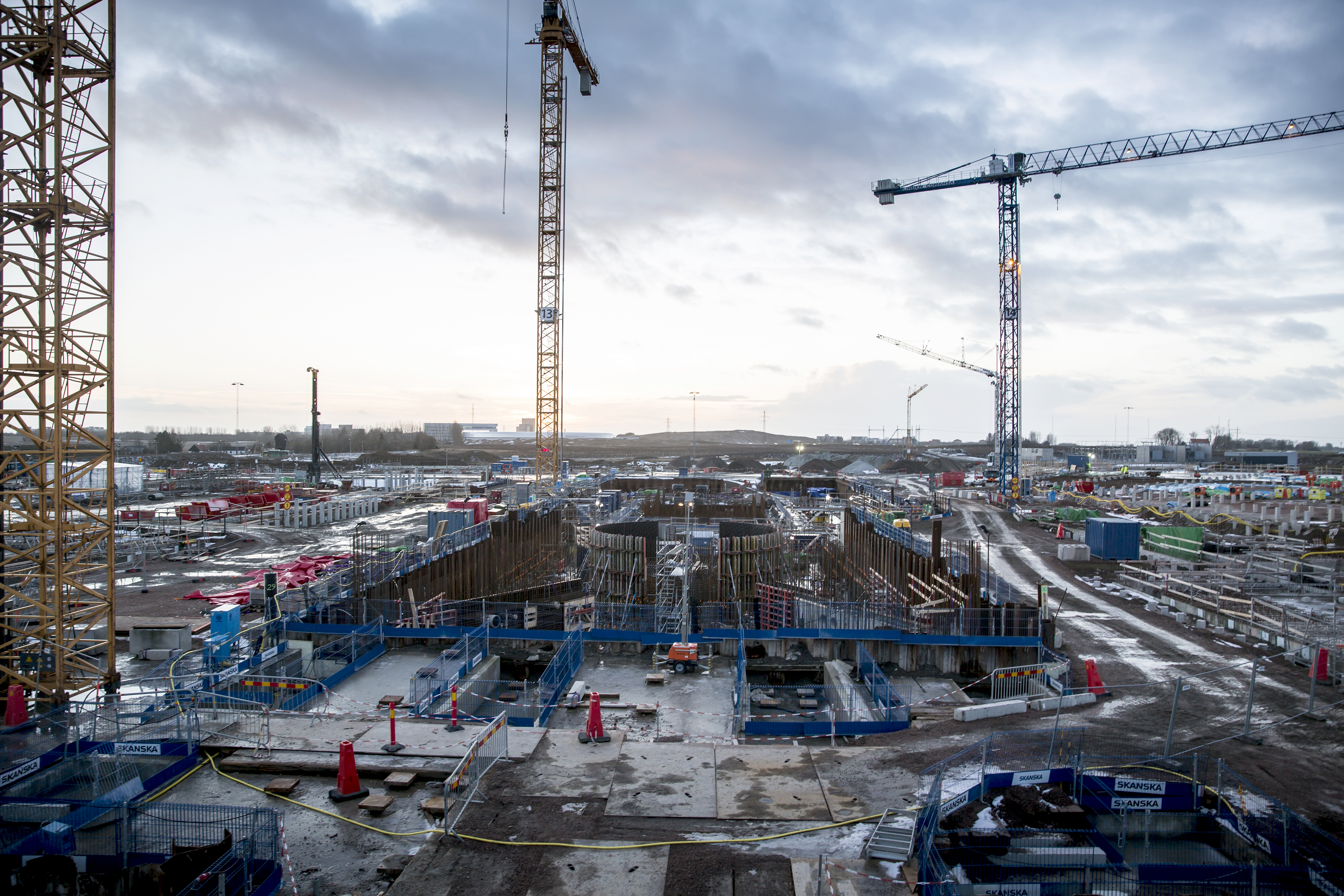
Building of European Spallation Source, January 2017

When the ISIS neutron source was built in England in 1985, its success in producing indirect images of molecular structures eventually raised the possibility of a far more powerful spallation source. By 1993, the European Neutron Scattering Association began to advocate for the construction of a new spallation source, and the project would eventually become known as the ESS.

Neutron science soon became a critical tool in the development of industrial and consumer products worldwide. So much so that the Organization for Economic Development (OECD), declared in 1999 that a new generation of high-intensity neutron sources should be built, one each in North America, Asia and Europe. Europe's challenge was its diverse collection of national governments, and an active research community numbering in the thousands. In 2001, a European roadmap for developing accelerator driven systems for nuclear waste incineration estimated that the ESS could have the beam ready for users in 2010. A European international task force gathered in Bonn, Germany in 2002 to review the findings and a positive consensus emerged to build the ESS. The stakeholders group met a year later to review the task force's progress, and in 2003 a new design concept was adopted that set the course for beginning operations by 2019.

Over the next five years a selection process chose Lund, Sweden as the site of the ESS; the definitive selection of Lund was announced in Brussels, Belgium, on 28 May 2009. On 1 July 2010, the staff and operations of ESS Scandinavia were transferred from Lund University to 'European Spallation Source ESS AB', a limited liability company set up to design, construct and operate the European Spallation Source in Lund. The company's headquarters are situated in central Lund.

ESS became a European Research Infrastructure Consortium, or ERIC, on 1 October 2015. The Founding Members of the European Spallation Source ERIC are the Czech Republic, Denmark, Estonia, France, Germany, Hungary, Italy, Norway, Poland, Spain, Sweden, Switzerland and the United Kingdom.

As of 2013, the estimated cost of the facility will be about €1.843 bn. (or $1.958 bn.). Host nations Sweden and Denmark each plan to cover about half of the sum. However, the negotiations about the exact contributions from every partner were still in progress. From 2010 to 30 September 2015, ESS was operated as a Swedish aktiebolag, or AB.

=== Site selection ===
Originally, three possible sites for the ESS were under consideration: Bilbao (Spain), Debrecen (Hungary) and Lund (Sweden).

On 28 May 2009, seven countries indicated support for placing ESS in Sweden. Furthermore, Switzerland and Italy indicated that they would support the site in majority. On 6 June 2009, Spain withdrew the Bilbao candidacy and signed a collaboration agreement with Sweden, supporting Lund as the main site, but with key component development work being performed in Bilbao. This effectively settled the location of the ESS; detailed economical negotiations between the participating countries then took place. On 18 December 2009, Hungary also chose to tentatively support ESS in Lund, thus withdrawing the candidacy of Debrecen.

The facility's construction began in early 2014, with an event held in September of that year. The user programme will start in 2027. The site is accessible from the center of Lund via Lund tramway, which opened in 2020.

== The linear accelerator ==
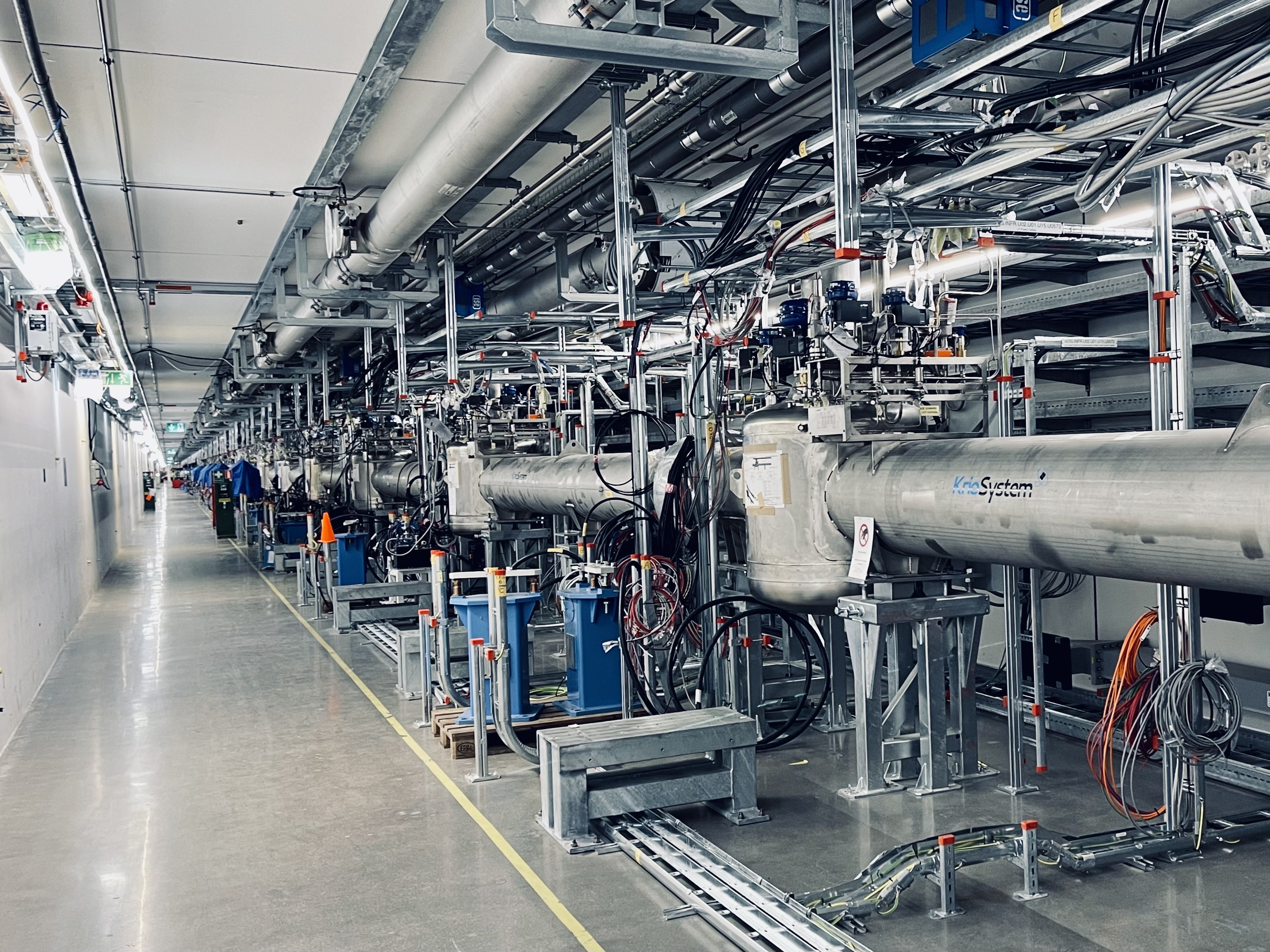
The Accelerator Tunnel (December 2021).

The ESS uses a linear accelerator (linac) to accelerate a beam of protons from the exit of its ion source at 75 keV to 2 GeV. At the entrance of the accelerator, protons are traveling at ~1% of the speed of light and at the end of the accelerator, they reach a velocity of ~95% of the speed of light. The accelerator uses both normal conducting and superconducting cavities.

The normal conducting cavities are radio frequency quadrupole (RFQ), working at a frequency of 352.21 MHz, and accelerating the proton beam up to an energy of 3.62 MeV. The next structure is a transport line for the medium energy protons, MEBT which transports the beam from the RFQ to the next structure for further acceleration. In the MEBT, the beam properties are measured, the beam is cleaned from the transverse halo around the beam, and also the head and tail of the beam pulse are cleaned using a transversally deflecting electromagnetic chopper. The Drift Tube Linac, DTL, which is the structure downstream of the MEBT accelerates the beam further to ~90 MeV. At this energy, there is a transition from normal conducting cavities to superconducting cavities.

Three families of superconducting cavities accelerate the beam to its final energy of 2 GeV, firstly a section using double-spoke cavities up to an energy of ~216 Mev, then two families of elliptical cavities which are optimized for medium and high energy proton acceleration at a frequency of 704.42 MHz. Following the elliptical cavities, a transfer-line guides the beam to the target, and just before sending the beam to the target for producing spallation neutrons expands the beam and paints the target to dissipate the generated heat over a larger area.

The linac repetition rate is 14 Hz, and the pulses of protons are 2.86 ms long, making the duty factor of the linac 4%. The beam current within the pulse is 62.5 mA, and the average beam current is 2.5 mA.

Except in the RFQ which uses the same structure and field to accelerate and focus the beam, the transverse focusing of the beam of protons is performed using magnetic lenses. In the low energy beam transport, right after the ion source, magnetic solenoids are used, in the DTL permanent quadrupole magnets are used and the rest of the linac uses electromagnetic quadrupoles.

== The spallation target and its environmental impact ==
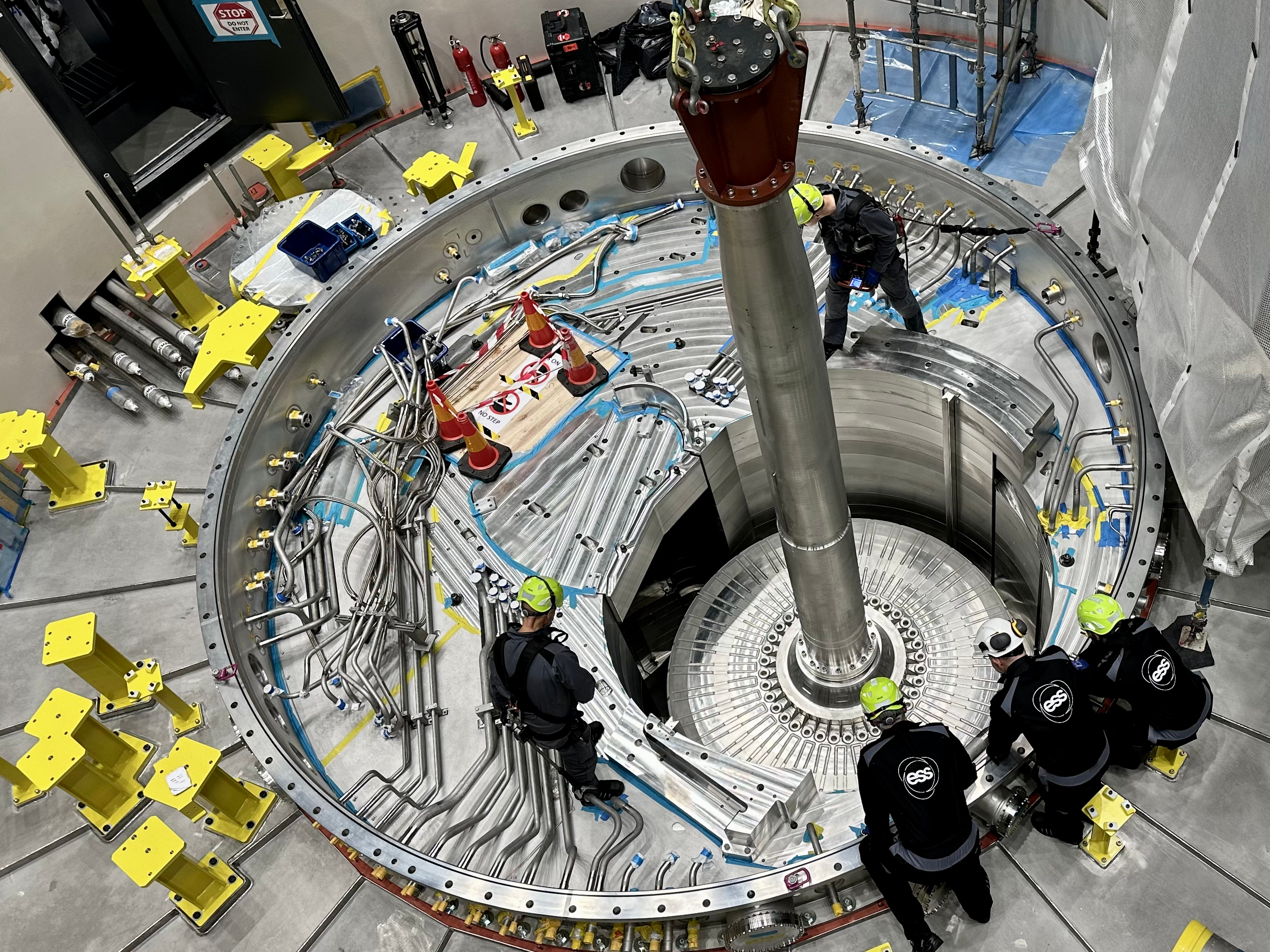
Ongoing installation of the tungsten target wheel, November 2023

- The ESS source will be built around a solid tungsten target, cooled by helium gas.
- Radioactive substances will be generated by the spallation process, but the solid target makes the handling of these materials easier and safer than if a liquid target had been used.
- ESS, E.on, and Lunds Energi are collaborating in a project aiming to get the facility to be the world's first completely sustainable large-scale research centre through investment in wind power. The ESS project is expected to include an extension of the Nysted Wind Farm.
- Radioactive material storage and transport will be required, but the need is much less than that of a nuclear reactor.
- ESS expects to be CO_{2}-neutral.
- Recent design improvements will decrease energy usage at ESS.

== Neutron Scattering and Imaging Instruments at ESS ==
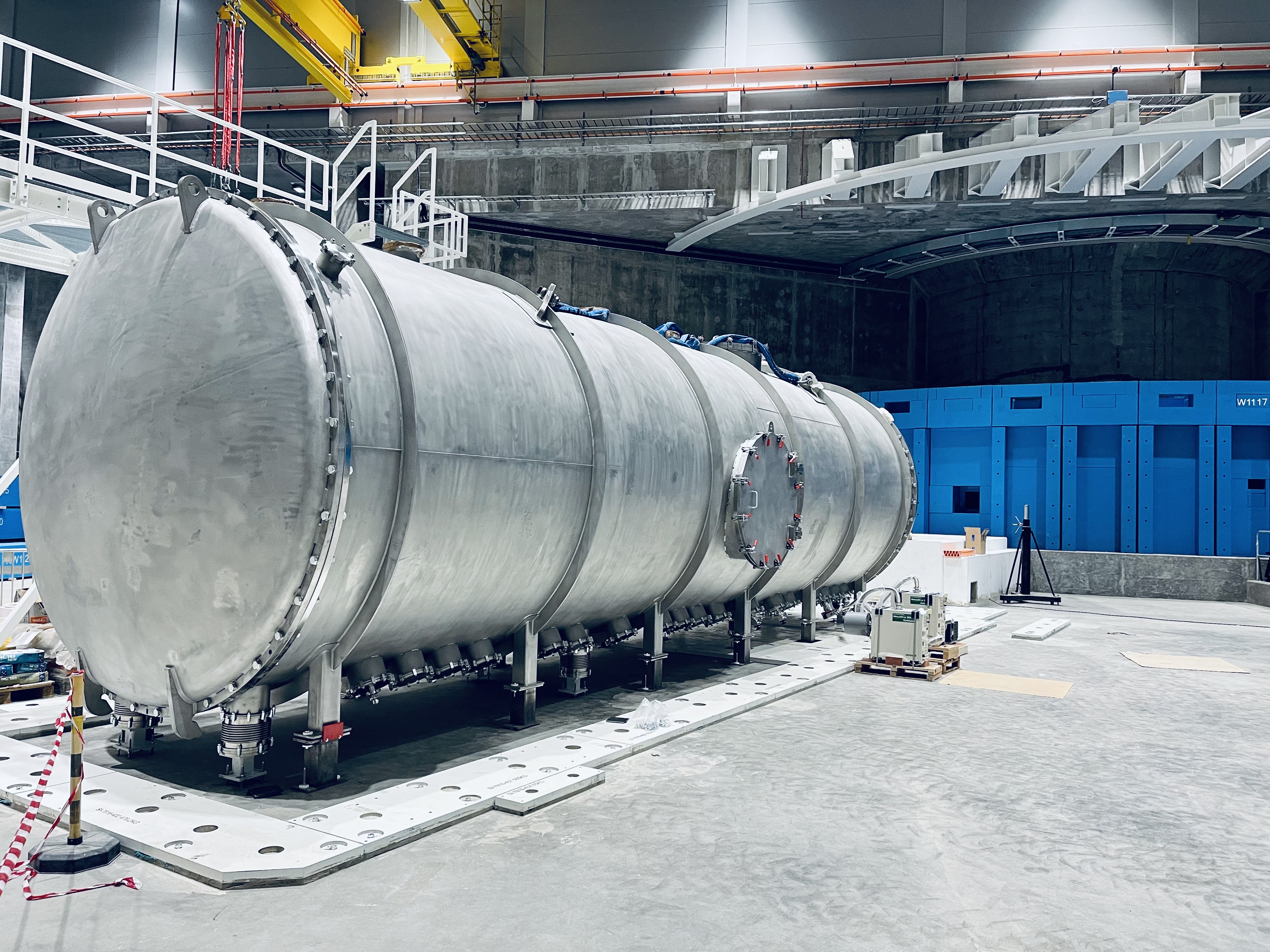
The instrument LOKI (December 2021)

The target station is surrounded by instrument halls with scientific instruments placed in four sections in the cardinal directions. In the western section, science instruments are located 156 meters from the center of the target station. The distance is between 50 and 80 meters in the southern one, and the science instruments located closest to the target station are in the northern and eastern sections.

Initially, 15 different scientific instruments will be constructed:

Large-scale structures:

- SKADI (General purpose SANS)
- LoKI (Broadband SANS)
- FREIA (Horizontal reflectometer)
- ESTIA (Vertical reflectometer)
- NMX (Macromolecular diffractometer)

Diffraction:

- HEIMDAL (Powder diffractometer)
- DREAM (Powder diffractometer)
- BEER (Engineering diffractometer)
- MAGiC (Magnetism diffractometer)
- ODIN (Imaging)

Spectroscopy:

- CSPEC (Cold chopper spectrometer)
- T-REX (Thermal chopper spectrometer)
- BIFROST (Crystal analyser spectrometer)
- VESPA (Vibrational spectrometer)
- MIRACLES (Backscattering spectrometer)

The LOKI, BIFROST and ODIN instruments were completed in December 2025. DREAM, NMX and ESTIA are expected to follow in the first part of 2026. With the exception of VESPA, the remaining instruments are expected to be completed before the end of 2027.

== Roadmap process for future instruments at the ESS ==
In February 2025 ESS advertised an invitation for the European Neutron Science community to contribute their input to a roadmap for future instruments at ESS, beyond the original 15. The call will remain open for on year.

== ESSnuSB/ESSnuSB+ ==
The European Spallation Source neutrino Super-Beam (ESSnuSB) is a proposed accelerator-based long-baseline neutrino experiment in Sweden. If this facility was built, high intensity neutrino beam would be produced aiming at measuring leptonic CP violation at the second neutrino oscillation maximum, offering higher sensitivity than the first maximum. After 10 years of data collection, ESSnuSB would be expected to cover over 70% of the CP-violating phase range with 5σ confidence level, achieving a precision better than 8° for all δCP values. The ESSnuSB+ extension project focuses on measuring neutrino-nucleus cross-sections in the 0.2–0.6 GeV energy range to address systematic uncertainties . This would be accomplished using two new facilities: a Low Energy nuSTORM (LEnuSTORM) and a Low Energy Monitored Neutrino Beam (LEMNB). The project also includes the development of a target station prototype, a common near detector, and studies on gadolinium-doped water Cherenkov detectors. This project is not currently funded nor in the plan for future ESS developments.

== See also ==
- ISIS neutron source – Spallation source located in Didcot, United Kingdom. Operational since 1984.
- Spallation Neutron Source - Spallation source located in Oak Ridge, Tennessee, USA. Operational since 2007.
- J-PARC – Spallation source located in Tokai, Japan. Operational since 2008.
- China Spallation Neutron Source - Spallation source located in Dongguan, China. Operational since 2018.
- MAX IV – Synchrotron x-ray radiation facility in Lund, Sweden.
