= Kurchatov Institute =

Russian nuclear energy research and development laboratory

Coordinates: 55°48′5″N 37°28′37″E

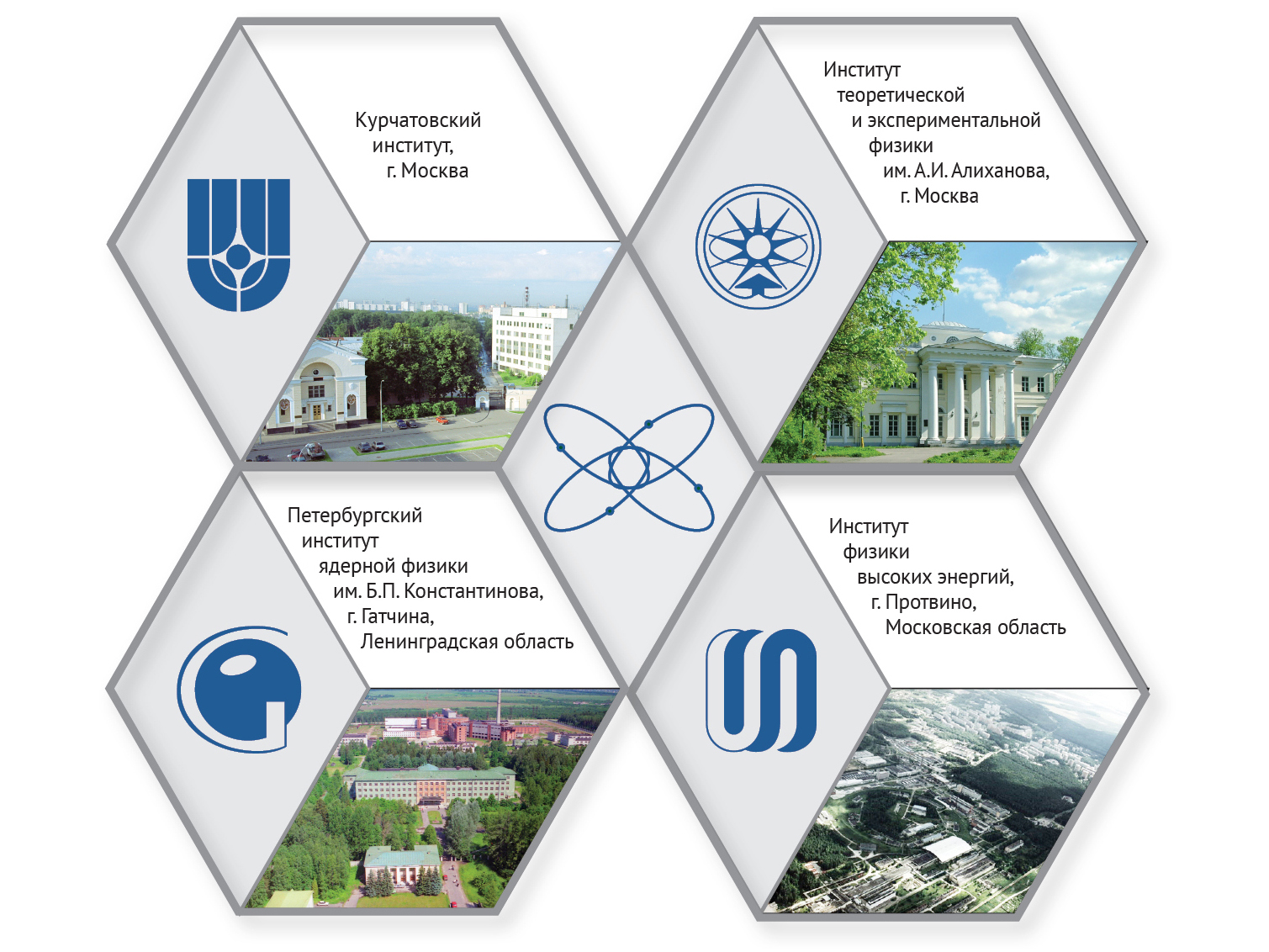
- Established: February 11, 1943
- Field of research: Nuclear energy and nuclear medicine; Plasma; Accelerator physics
- Director: Alexander Blagov
- Location: 1 Kurchatov Square, Moscow, Moscow Oblast, Russia
- Website: kcsni.nrcki.ru/en.shtml

The Kurchatov Institute (Russian: Национальный исследовательский центр «Курчатовский Институт», National Research Centre "Kurchatov Institute") is Russia's leading research and development institution in the field of nuclear energy. It is named after Igor Kurchatov and is located at 1 Kurchatov Square, Moscow.

In the Soviet Union it was known as I. V. Kurchatov Institute of Atomic Energy (Russian: Институт Атомной Энергии им. И.В. Курчатова), abbreviated KIAE (Russian: КИАЭ). Between 1991 and 2010, it was known as the Russian Scientific Centre "Kurchatov Institute" (Роcсийский научный центр «Курчатовский Институт») before its name was changed to National Research Centre "Kurchatov Institute".

== History ==
T-3 tokamak in the 1960s

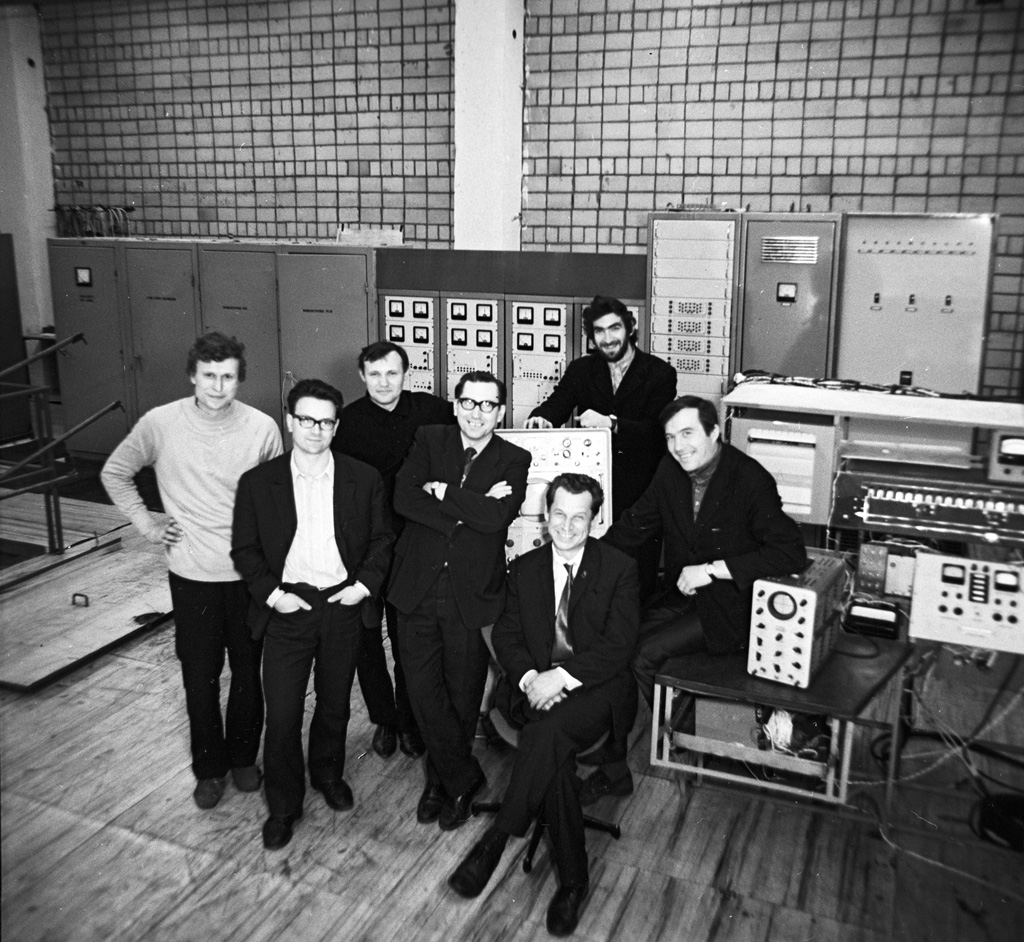
Kurchatov Institute of Atomic Energy, with the staff of a 1974 magnetic field project

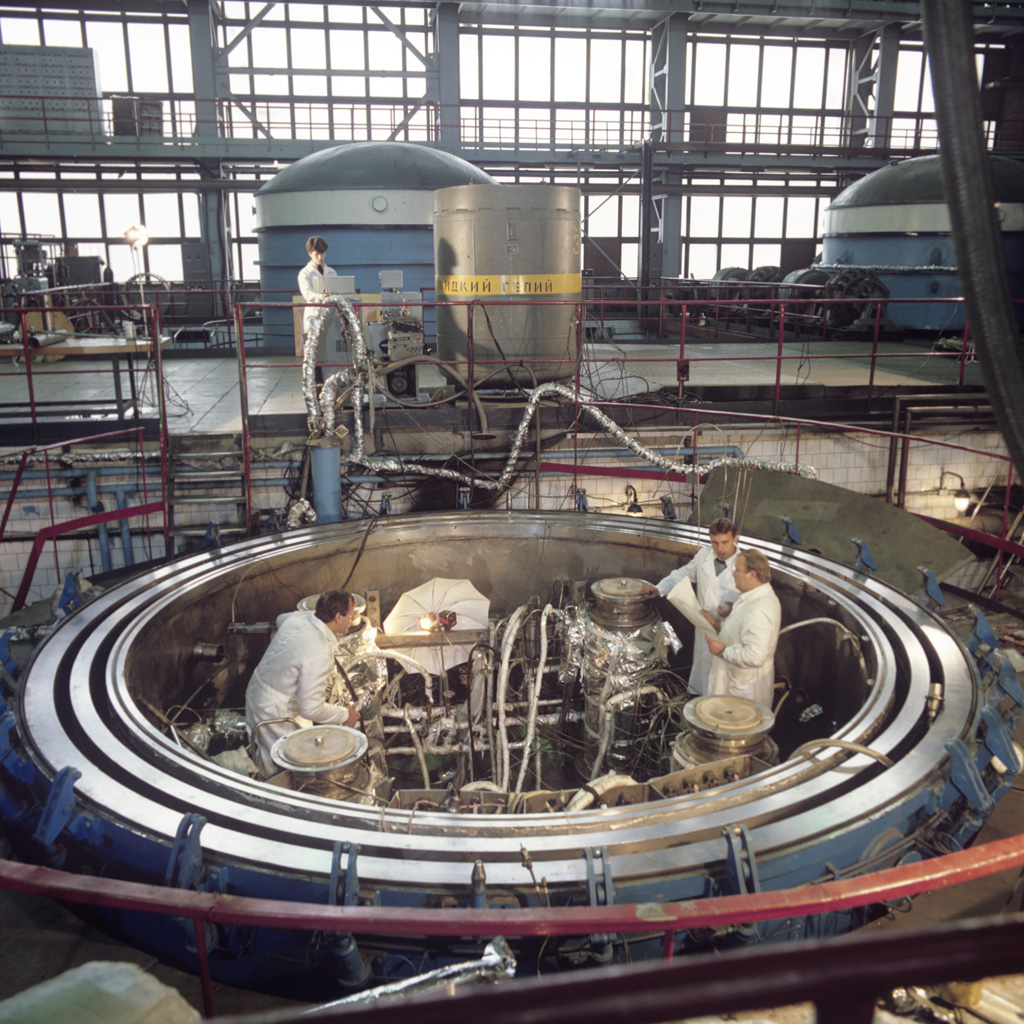
A stand for magnetic systems testing at Kurchatov Institute, photographed in 1986

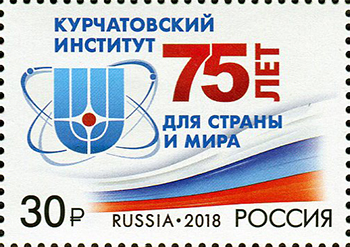
2018 postage stamp, issued by Russia to the 75th anniversary of the institute

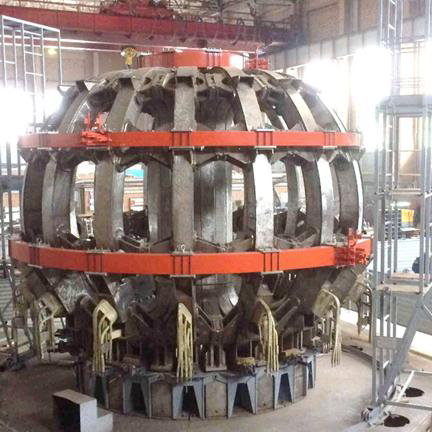
The T-15MD tokamak under construction.

Until 1955 known under a secret name "Laboratory No. 2 of the USSR Academy of Sciences", the Kurchatov Institute was founded in 1943 with the initial purpose of developing nuclear weapons. The majority of Soviet nuclear reactors were designed in the institute, including the on-site F-1, which was the first nuclear reactor outside North America to sustain criticality.

Since 1955, it was also the host for major scientific experimental work in the fields of thermonuclear fusion and plasma physics. In particular, the first tokamak systems were developed there, the most successful of them being T-3 and its larger version T-4. T-4 was tested in 1968 in Novosibirsk, conducting the first quasistationary thermonuclear fusion reaction ever.

Two reactor reactor criticality accidents occurred in 1971, injuring four and killing two. The details were kept secret until the late 1990s, well after the fall of the Soviet Union.

In the 1980s, Kurchatov Institute employees and computer engineers played a very important role in establishing computer culture through participating in the development of the DEMOS operating system. It led to the spread of the internet in Russia and contributed to the dissolution of the Soviet Union.

Until 1991, the Ministry of Atomic Energy oversaw the Kurchatov Institute's administration. After the transformation into the State Scientific Center in November 1991, the institute became subordinated directly to the Russian government. According to the institute's charter, its director is appointed by the prime minister based on recommendations from Rosatom. In February 2005 Mikhail Kovalchuk was appointed director of the institute; since 2015 he has been president of the institute, and the position of a director was occupied by V. Ilgisonis, D. Minkin and (from November 2018) Alexander Blagov. In February 2007, the Kurchatov Institute won the tender to be the main organization coordinating efforts in nanotechnology in Russia.

The Kurchatov Institute is also in charge of coordinating Russia's participation in international large-scale projects such as the X-ray laser research facility European XFEL in Hamburg and the Facility for Antiproton and Ion Research (FAIR) in Darmstadt, both Germany, the international fusion reactor project ITER in Cadarache and the European Synchrotron Radiation Facility (ESRF) in Grenoble (both France) and the particle physics research center CERN in France and Switzerland.

Shortly after the start of the 2022 Russian invasion of Ukraine, the institute issued a statement which endorsed the invasion, claiming that the neighboring country had been transformed "primarily due to the efforts of our Western partners, into a neo-Nazi bridgehead" and that the invasion was justified because it was aimed at "preventing the threat of a direct attack on our country from its territory."

History of tokamak experiments at the Kurchatov Institute
Tokamak	Year	Major torus radius (m)	Minor plasma column radius (m)	Toroidal magnetic field (T)	Longitudinal plasma current (MA)	Notes
Tokamak	Year	R	a	B_{t}	I	Notes
TMF	1955	0.8	0.13	1.5	0.26	First tokamak experiment
T-1	1958	0.62	0.13	1.0	0.04	First tokamak with all-metal chamber and to exceed safety factor of 1
T-2	?	~0.62	~0.13	~1.0	~0.04	
T-3	1960	1.0	0.06	4.0	0.06	
T-5	1961	0.625	0.2	1.2	0.045	
TM-2	1962	0.4	0.08	2.2	0.02	
TM-3	1966	0.4	0.08	2.5	0.1	First electron cyclotron resonance heating experiments; 1972
T-3A	1967	1.0	0.15	3.8	0.14	First tokamak to produce thermonuclear reactions; 1969
T-6	1970	0.7	0.25	1.5	0.27	
T-4	1971	0.9	0.16	5	0.25	First tokamak to use a carbon limiter
TO-1	1972	0.6	0.13	1.5	0.07	
T-8	1973	0.28	0.05	0.9	0.024	First tokamak to use D-shaped chamber
T-9	1973	0.36	0.07	1.0	0.04	
T-11	1976					
T-10	1975	1.5	0.39	4	0.6	
TO-2	1976					
TMG	1976	0.4	0.078	3.2	0.082	First tokamak with a graphite first wall
T-7	1979	1.2	0.3	3	0.3	First tokamak with superconducting toroidal magnets
T-15	1988	2.4	0.7	3.6	1	
T-15MD	2021	1.48	0.67	2.0	2.0	Supports ITER, intended for fission hybrid experiments

== International projects ==
The institute is involved in:

- ITER
- FAIR
- IGNITOR

== Reactors ==
Reactors were designed by researchers of the institute, such as:

=== Fission ===
- F-1
- GT-MHR
- RBMK
- EGP-6
- ELENA
- Romashka reactor
- VBER-300
- VVER

=== Fusion ===
- T-1
- T-3A
- T-10
- T-15(MD)

== See also ==
- List of plasma physics software
