= Spallation =

Ejection of fragments from a solid body of material

Spallation as a result of impact can occur with or without penetration of the impacting object.

Very high-speed photography of a small projectile striking a thin aluminium plate at 7,000 m/s (16,000 mph). The impact causes the projectile to disintegrate, and generates a large number of small fragments from the aluminium. This can occur without penetration of the plate.

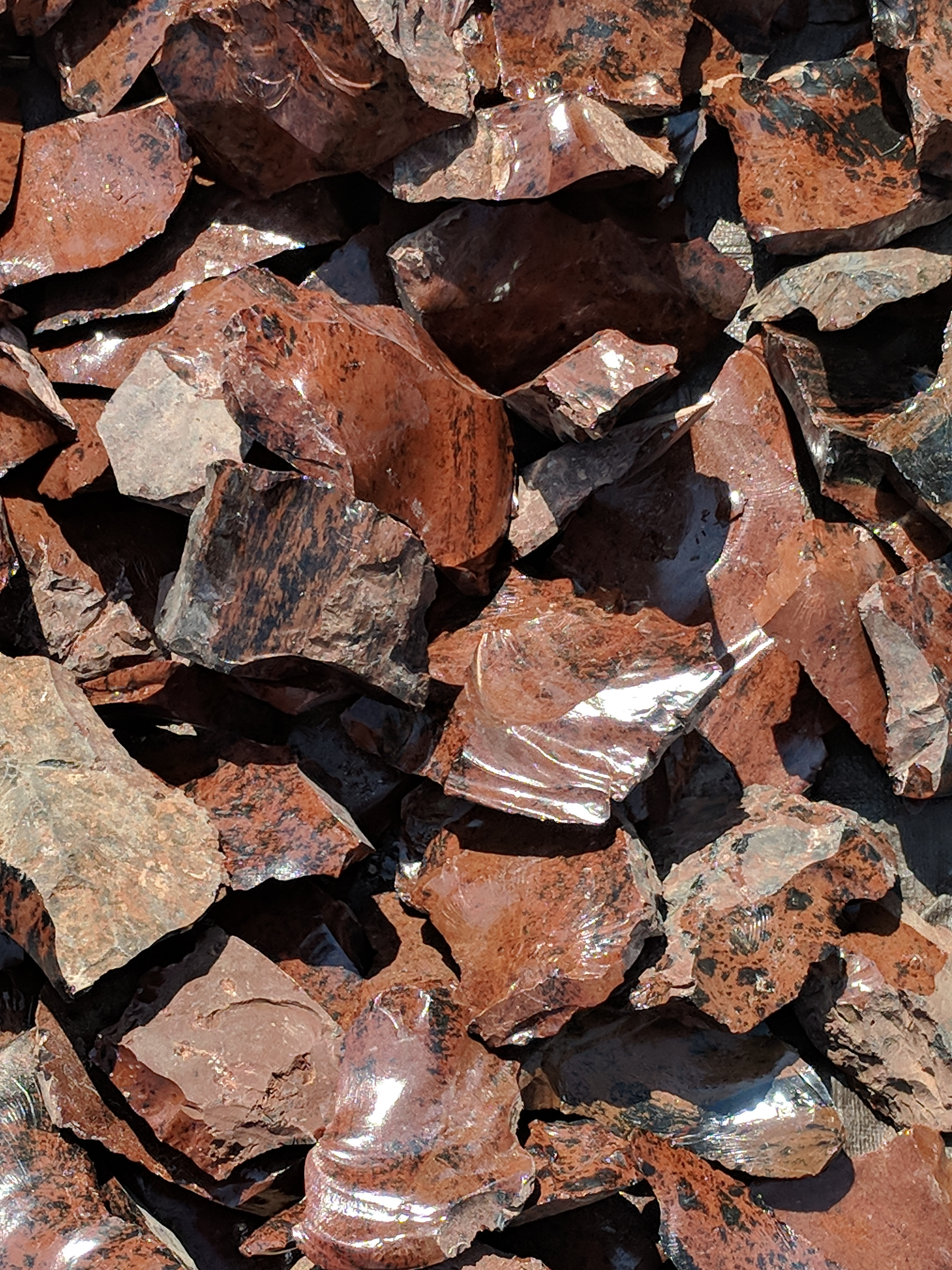
Spall from the knapping of obsidian (as by Native Americans) to form arrowheads and other tools. These unique obsidians occur at Glass Buttes, Oregon.

Spallation or spalling is a process of surface failure in which fragments of material, called spall, are ejected from a solid object due to impact or stress, such as collision of a projectile (in planetary physics, commonly a meteor hitting the a planetary surface, or the effects of stellar winds and cosmic rays on planetary atmospheres and surfaces), corrosion, weathering, cavitation, or excessive rolling pressure (as in a ball bearing). Additional examples in particular contexts include: in mining or geology, pieces of rock breaking off a rock face due to the internal stresses in the rock, which commonly occurs on mine shaft walls; in metal oxidation, the breaking off of the oxide layer from a metal, such as the flaking off of rust from iron; in anthropology, a process used to make stone tools such as arrowheads by knapping; in nuclear physics, the process in which a heavy nucleus emits numerous nucleons as a result of being hit by a high-energy particle, thus greatly reducing its atomic weight (in particular, when neutron scattering instruments generate neutrons by bombarding a uranium (or other) target with a stream of atoms, the neutrons ejected from the target are known as spall); and in industrial processes and bioprocessing, the loss of tubing material due to the repeated flexing of the tubing within a peristaltic pump.

== In solid mechanics ==
Spallation can occur when a tensile stress wave propagates through a material and can be observed in flat plate impact tests. It is caused by an internal cavitation due to stresses, which are generated by the interaction of stress waves, exceeding the local tensile strength of materials. A fragment or multiple fragments will be created on the free end of the plate. This fragment known as "spall" acts as a secondary projectile with velocities that can be as high as one third of the stress wave speed on the material. This type of failure is typically an effect of high explosive squash head (HESH) charges.

== Mechanical spalling ==
Mechanical spalling occurs at high-stress contact points, for example, in a ball bearing. Spalling occurs in preference to brinelling, where the maximal shear stress occurs not at the surface, but just below, shearing the spall off.

One of the simplest forms of mechanical spalling is plate impact, in which two waves of compression are reflected on the free-surfaces of the plates and then interact to generate a region of high tensile stress inside one of the plates.

Spalling can also occur as an effect of cavitation, where fluids are subjected to localized low pressures that cause vapour bubbles to form, typically in pumps, water turbines, vessel propellers, and even piping under some conditions. When such bubbles collapse, a localized high pressure can cause spalling on adjacent surfaces.

=== Anti-tank warfare ===
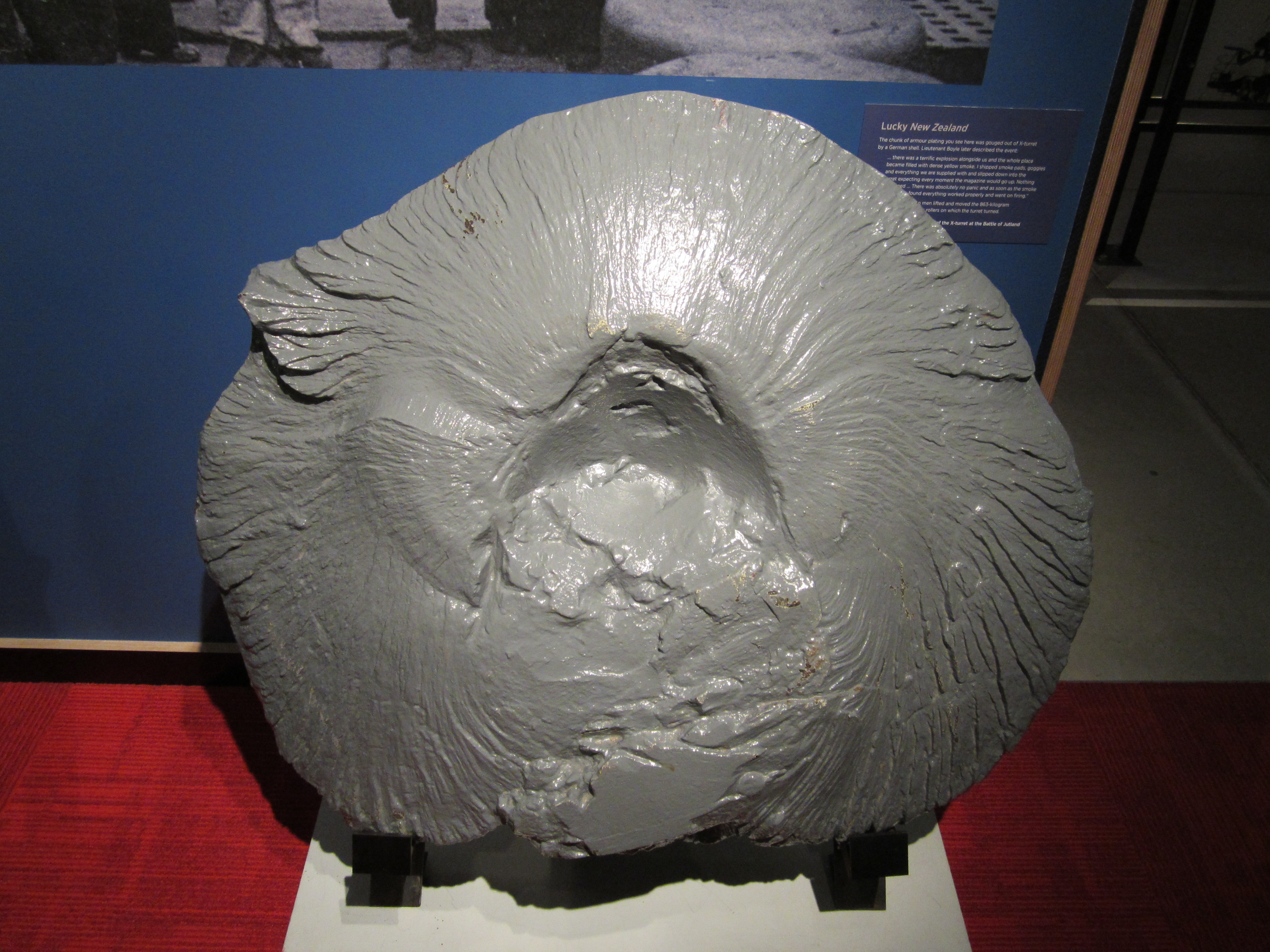
A chunk of armour knocked from HMS New Zealand's "X" turret during the Battle of Jutland on display at the Torpedo Bay Navy Museum in Auckland. Caption reads, "The chunk of armour plating you see here was gouged out of X turret by a German shell."

In anti-tank warfare, spalling through mechanical stress is an intended effect of high-explosive squash head (HESH) anti-tank shells and many other munitions, which may not be powerful enough to pierce the armour of a target. The relatively soft warhead, containing or made of plastic explosive, flattens against the armour plating on tanks and other armoured fighting vehicles (AFVs) and explodes, creating a shock wave that travels through the armour as a compression wave and is reflected at the free surface as a tensile wave breaking (tensile stress/strain fracture) the metal on the inside. The resulting spall is dangerous to crew and equipment, and may result in a partial or complete disablement of a vehicle and/or its crew. Many AFVs are equipped with spall liners inside their armour for protection.

A kinetic energy penetrator, if it can defeat the armour, generally causes spalling within the target as well, which helps to destroy or disable the vehicle and its crew.

An early example of anti-tank weapon intentionally designed to cause spallation instead of penetration is the wz. 35 anti-tank rifle.

== Spalling in mechanical weathering ==
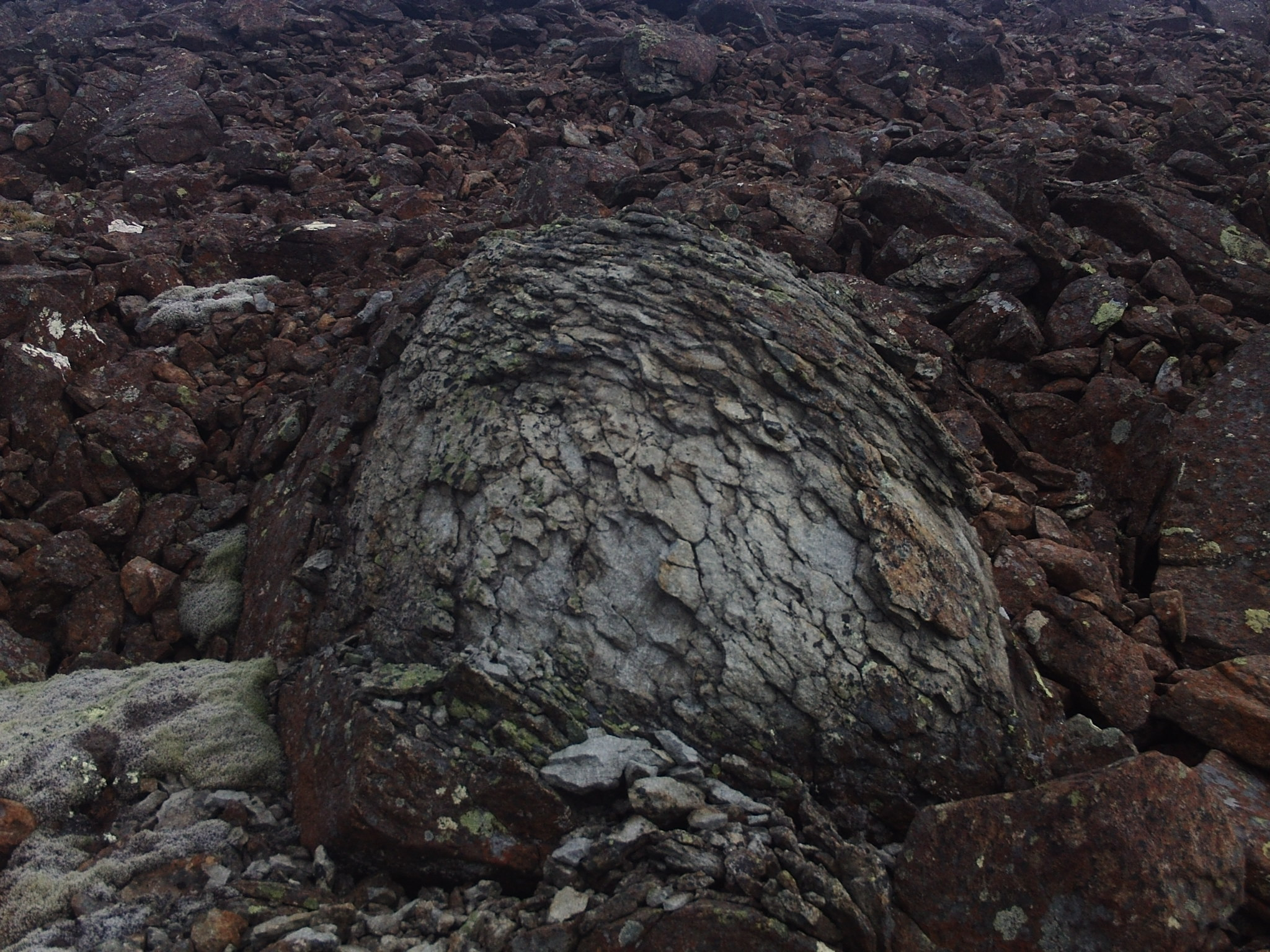
Desquamation of dunite boulder

Spalling is a common mechanism of rock weathering, and occurs at the surface of a rock when there are large shear stresses under the surface. This form of mechanical weathering can be caused by freezing and thawing, unloading, thermal expansion and contraction, or salt deposition.

=== Unloading ===
Unloading is the release of pressure due to the removal of an overburden. When the pressure is reduced rapidly, the rapid expansion of the rock causes high surface stress and spalling.

=== Freeze–thaw weathering ===
Freeze–thaw weathering is caused by moisture freezing inside cracks in rock. Upon freezing its volume expands, causing large forces which cracks spall off the outer surface. As this cycle repeats the outer surface repeatedly undergoes spalling, resulting in weathering.

Some stone and masonry surfaces used as building surfaces will absorb moisture at their surface. If exposed to severe freezing conditions, the surface may flake off due to the expansion of the water. This effect can also be seen in terracotta surfaces (even if glazed) if there is an entrance for water at the edges.

=== Exfoliation ===
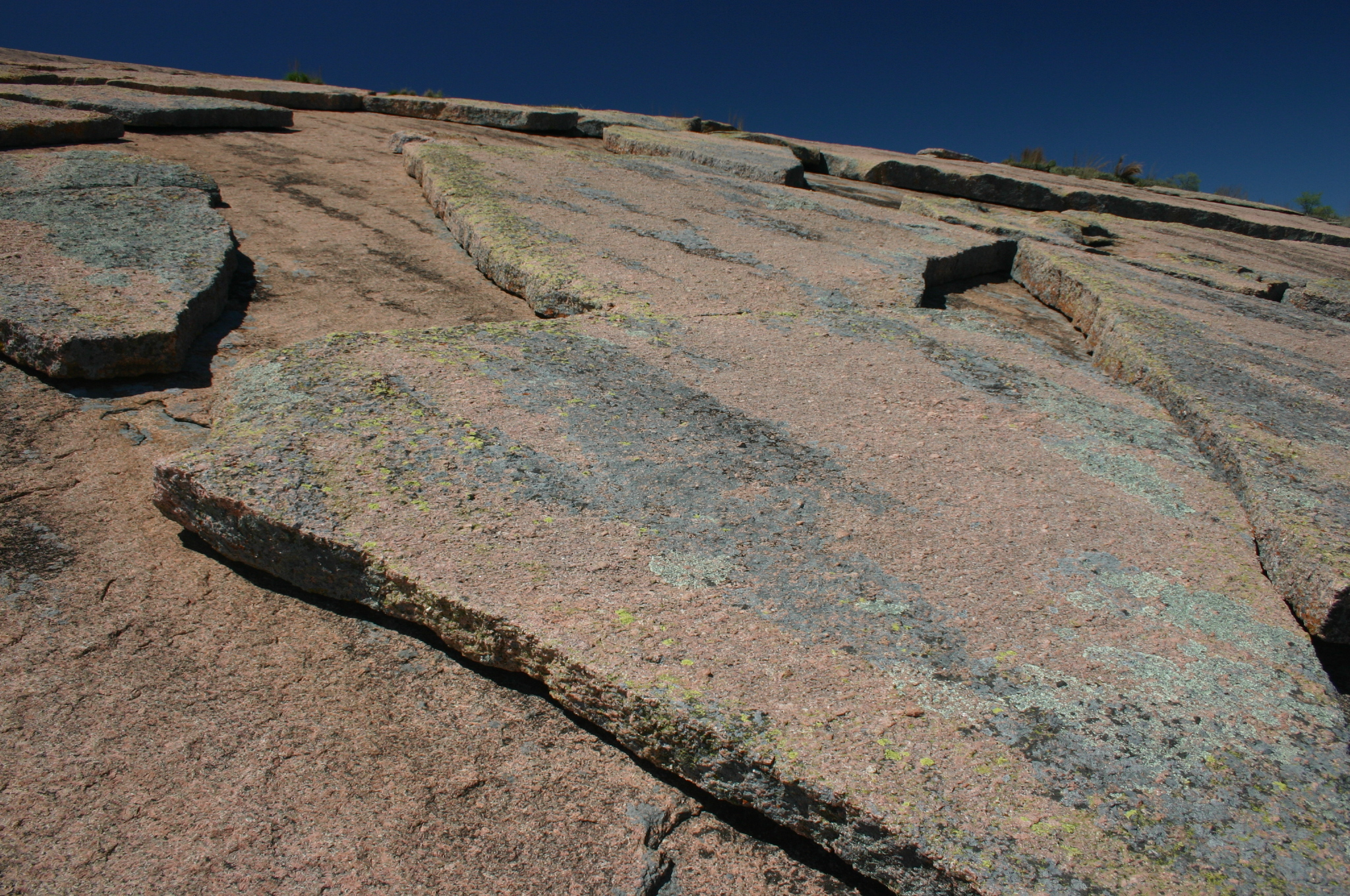
Granite dome exfoliation

Exfoliation (or onion skin weathering) is the gradual removing of spall due to the cyclic increase and decrease in the temperature of the surface layers of the rock. Rocks do not conduct heat well, so when they are exposed to extreme heat, the outermost layer becomes much hotter than the rock underneath causing differential thermal expansion. This differential expansion causes sub-surface shear stress, in turn causing spalling. Extreme temperature change, such as forest fires, can also cause spalling of rock. This mechanism of weathering causes the outer surface of the rock to fall off in thin fragments, sheets or flakes, hence the name exfoliation or onion skin weathering.

=== Salt spalling ===
Salt spalling is a specific type of weathering which occurs in porous building materials, such as brick, natural stone, tiles and concrete. Dissolved salt is carried through the material in water and crystallizes inside the material near the surface as the water evaporates. As the salt crystals expand this builds up shear stresses which break away spall from the surface.

== Corrosion ==
In corrosion, spalling occurs when a substance (metal or concrete) sheds tiny particles of corrosion products as the corrosion reaction progresses. Although they are not soluble or permeable, these corrosion products do not adhere to the parent material's surface to form a barrier to further corrosion, as happens in passivation. Spallation happens as the result of a large volume change during the reaction.

In the case of actinide metals (most notably the depleted uranium used in some types of ammunition), the material expands so strongly upon exposure to air that a fine layer of oxide is forcibly expelled from the surface. A slowly oxidised plug of metallic uranium can sometimes resemble an onion subjected to desquamation. The main hazard however arises from the pyrophoric character of actinide metals which can spontaneously ignite when their specific area is high. This property, along with the inherent toxicity and (for some to a lesser extent) radioactivity of these elements, make them dangerous to handle in metallic form under air. Therefore, they are often handled under an inert atmosphere (nitrogen or argon) inside an anaerobic glovebox.

== Spalling in refractory concrete ==
There are two drivers for spalling of concrete: thermal strain caused by rapid heating and internal pressures due to the removal of water. Being able to predict the outcome of different heating rates on thermal stresses and internal pressure during water removal is particularly important to industry and other concrete structures.

Explosive spalling events of refractory concrete can result in serious problems. If an explosive spalling occurs, projectiles of reasonable mass (1–10 kg) can be thrust violently over many metres, which will have safety implications and render the refractory structure unfit for service. Repairs will then be required resulting in significant costs to industry.

== Anatomical spalling in blast injuries ==
Blast-wave overpressure from explosions can cause spalling in the human body where the wave travels across the interface between denser to less-dense areas of anatomy. This is notable at the boundary between liquid and air, for example from the bowel wall to a gas-filled bowel, or from lung tissue to cavity. Spallation, implosion, and shearing are the three primary mechanisms known to cause blast injuries.

== Laser spallation ==
Laser induced spallation is a recent experimental technique developed to understand the adhesion of thin films with substrates. A high energy pulsed laser (typically Nd:YAG) is used to create a compressive stress pulse in the substrate wherein it propagates and reflects as a tensile wave at the free boundary. This tensile pulse spalls/peels the thin film while propagating towards the substrate. Using theory of wave propagation in solids it is possible to extract the interface strength. The stress pulse created in this example is usually around 3 to 8 nanoseconds in duration while its magnitude varies as a function of laser fluence. Due to the non-contact application of load, this technique is very well suited to spall ultra-thin films (1 micrometre in thickness or less). It is also possible to mode convert a longitudinal stress wave into a shear stress using a pulse shaping prism and achieve shear spallation.

== Nuclear spallation ==
Nuclear spallation from the impact of cosmic rays occurs naturally in Earth's atmosphere and on the surfaces of bodies in space such as meteorites and the Moon. Evidence of cosmic ray spallation is seen on outer surfaces of bodies and gives a means of measuring the length of time of exposure. The composition of cosmic rays themselves may also indicate that they have suffered spallation before reaching Earth, because the proportion of light elements such as lithium, boron, and beryllium in them exceeds average cosmic abundances; these elements in the cosmic rays were evidently formed from spallation of oxygen, nitrogen, carbon and perhaps silicon in the cosmic ray sources or during their lengthy travel here. Cosmogenic isotopes of aluminium, beryllium, chlorine, iodine and neon, formed by spallation of terrestrial elements under cosmic ray bombardment, have been detected on Earth.

Nuclear spallation is one of the processes by which a particle accelerator may be used to produce a beam of neutrons. A particle beam consisting of protons at around 1 GeV is shot into a target consisting of mercury, tantalum, lead or another heavy metal. The target nuclei are excited and upon deexcitation, 20 to 30 neutrons are expelled per nucleus. Although this is a far more expensive way of producing neutron beams than by a chain reaction of nuclear fission in a nuclear reactor, it has the advantage that the beam can be pulsed with relative ease. Furthermore, the energetic cost of one spallation neutron is six times lower than that of a neutron gained via nuclear fission. In contrast to nuclear fission, the spallation neutrons cannot trigger further spallation or fission processes to produce further neutrons. Therefore, there is no chain reaction, which makes the process non-critical. Observations of cosmic ray spallation had already been made in the 1930s, but the first observations from a particle accelerator occurred in 1947, and the term "spallation" was coined by Nobelist Glenn T. Seaborg that same year. Spallation is a proposed neutron source in subcritical nuclear reactors like the upcoming research reactor MYRRHA, which is planned to investigate the feasibility of nuclear transmutation of high-level waste into less harmful substances. Besides having a neutron multiplication factor just below criticality, subcritical reactors can also produce net usable energy, as the average energy expenditure per neutron produced ranges around 30 MeV (1 GeV beam producing a bit over 30 neutrons in the most productive targets), while fission produces on the order of 200 MeV per actinide atom that is split. Even at relatively low energy efficiency of the processes involved, net usable energy could be generated while being able to use actinides unsuitable for use in conventional reactors as "fuel".

=== Production of neutrons at a spallation neutron source ===
Generally the production of neutrons at a spallation source begins with a high-powered proton accelerator. The accelerator may consist of a linac only (as in the European Spallation Source) or a combination of linac and synchrotron (e.g. ISIS neutron source) or a cyclotron (e.g. SINQ (PSI)). As an example, the ISIS neutron source is based on some components of the former Nimrod synchrotron. Nimrod was uncompetitive for particle physics so it was replaced with a new synchrotron, initially using the original injectors, but which produces a highly intense pulsed beam of protons. Whereas Nimrod would produce around 2 μA at 7 GeV, ISIS produces 200 μA at 0.8 GeV. This is pulsed at the rate of 50 Hz, and this intense beam of protons is focused onto a target. Experiments have been done with depleted uranium targets, but although these produce the most intense neutron beams, they also have the shortest lives. Generally, therefore, tantalum or tungsten targets have been used. Spallation processes in the target produce the neutrons, initially at very high energies—a good fraction of the proton energy. These neutrons are then slowed in moderators filled with liquid hydrogen or liquid methane to the energies that are needed for the scattering instruments. Whilst protons can be focused, since they have charge, chargeless neutrons cannot be, so in this arrangement the instruments are arranged around the moderators.

Inertial confinement fusion has the potential to produce orders of magnitude more neutrons than spallation. This could be useful for neutron radiography, which can be used to locate hydrogen atoms in structures, resolve atomic thermal motion, and study collective excitations of phonons more effectively than X-rays.

== See also ==
- Behind-armour debris
- Cosmogenic nuclide
- Energy amplifier
- Frangibility
- Friability
- Misnay–Schardin effect
- Nuclear transmutation
- Neutron moderator
- Ore dressing
- Proton therapy
- Pyrophoricity
- Runit Island
- Subcritical reactor (accelerator-driven system)
- Sputtering (phenomenon in which microscopic particles of a solid material are ejected from its surface)
- Whipple shield

=== Spallation facilities ===
- Institut-Laue-Langevin Grenoble, France
- European Spallation Source, under construction, Sweden
- ISIS neutron source, Harwell, UK
- J-PARC
- LANSCE Los Alamos
- PSI Spallation Neutron Source (SINQ), Switzerland
- Spallation Neutron Source Oak Ridge, USA
- China Spallation Neutron Source
