= T-15 (reactor) =

Russian tokamak

Coordinates: 55.8014°N 37.4769°E

Tokamak-15
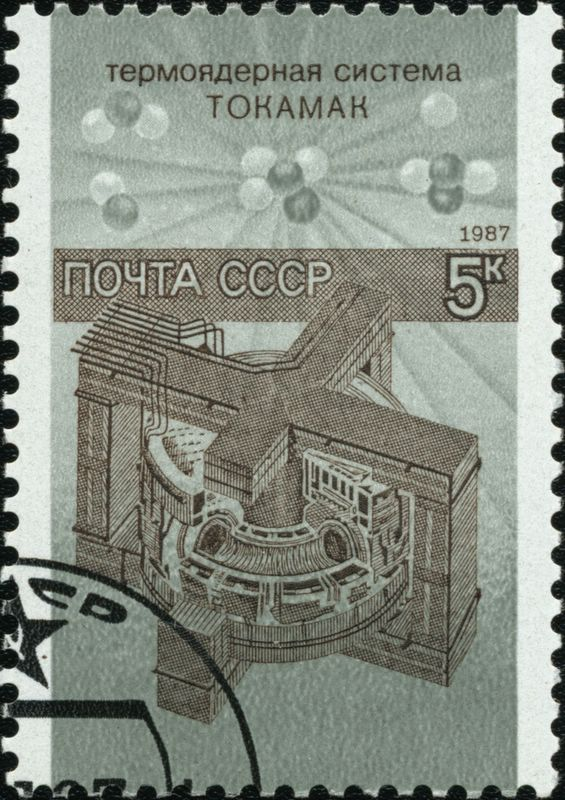
- T-15 tokamak on a 1987 USSR stamp
- Device type: Tokamak
- Location: Moscow, Russia
- Affiliation: Kurchatov Institute

Technical specifications
- Major radius: 2.43 m (8 ft 0 in)
- Minor radius: 0.7 m (2 ft 4 in)
- Plasma volume: 24 m^{3}
- Magnetic field: 3.6 T (36,000 G)
- Heating power: 3 MW

History
- Year(s) of operation: 1988–1995
- Succeeded by: T-15MD

The T-15 (or Tokamak-15) is a Russian (previously Soviet) nuclear fusion research reactor located at the Kurchatov Institute, which is based on the (Soviet-invented) tokamak design. It was the first industrial prototype fusion reactor to use superconducting magnets to control the plasma. These enormous superconducting magnets confined the plasma the reactor produced, but failed to sustain it for more than just a few seconds. Despite not being immediately applicable, this new technological advancement proved to the USSR that they were on the right path. In the original (circular cross-section with limiter) shape, a toroidal chamber design, it had a major radius of 2.43 m and minor radius 0.7 m.

The T-15 achieved creating its first thermonuclear plasma in 1988 and the reactor remained operational until 1995. The plasma created was thought to solve a number of issues engineers have struggled with in the past. This combined with the USSR's desire for cheaper energy ensured the continuing progress of the T-15 under Mikhail S. Gorbachev. It was designed to replace the country's use of gas and coal as the primary sources of energy.

It achieved 1 MA and 1.5 MW injection for 1 second pulse. It carried out about 100 shots before closing (in 1995) due to a lack of funds.

== 1996 upgrade ==
From 1996 to 1998 a series of upgrades were made to the reactor, in order to conduct preliminary research for the design work on the International Thermonuclear Experimental Reactor or ITER. One of the upgrades converted the tokamak to a D-shape divertor design with a major plasma radius of 1.5 m. ITER will also use superconducting magnets. The nuclear predecessors before such as the T-10 were capable of reaching 16.7 MK plasma temperature. This increased temperature made it possible to introduce the electron cyclotron resonance (ECR), ion cyclotron resonance (ICR), and neutral atoms, as to maintain the reactions.

== Upgrade to T-15MD ==
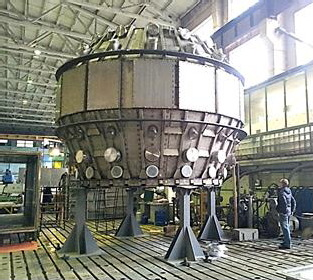
T-15MD vacuum vessel shell

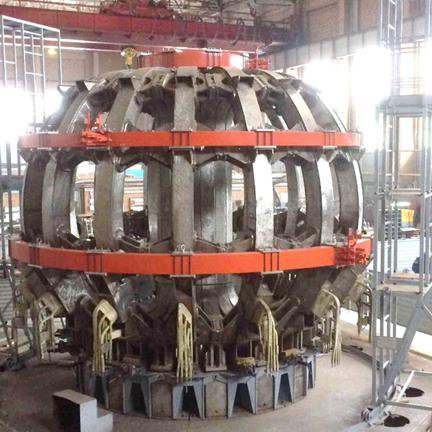
T-15MD toroidal winding and poloidal field coils after disassembly

In the year 2010 it was decided to upgrade the reactor. The upgraded machine is called T-15MD. On the basis of the T-15 there will be created a nuclear fusion–fission hybrid reactor, intended to use the neutrons generated by a core fusion reactor component to incite fission in otherwise nonfissile fuels, and to explore the feasibility of such a system for power generation. Assembly of the magnetic coils was finished in August 2019. As of early 2020 the status of construction was reported as "entering the final phase". At the end of 2020, preparations for the physical start-up of T-15MD were completed. The physical launch took place in May 2021 and further hardware upgrades are planned until 2024.

T-15MD has a major radius R = 1.48 m and a minor radius a = 0.67 m. The toroidal magnetic field is 2 T, produced by ordinary conducting coils. The intended plasma current is 2 MA, which is planned to be sustained for 40 s with neutral particle injection and microwaves, and without using inductive current drive.
