= J-PARC =

Research facility in Japan

Coordinates: 36.445°N 140.606°E

J-PARC (Japan Proton Accelerator Research Complex) is a high intensity proton accelerator facility. It is a joint project between KEK and JAEA and is located at the Tokai campus of JAEA. J-PARC aims for the frontier in materials and life sciences, and nuclear and particle physics. J-PARC uses high intensity proton beams to create high intensity secondary beams of neutrons, hadrons, and neutrinos.

== Components ==
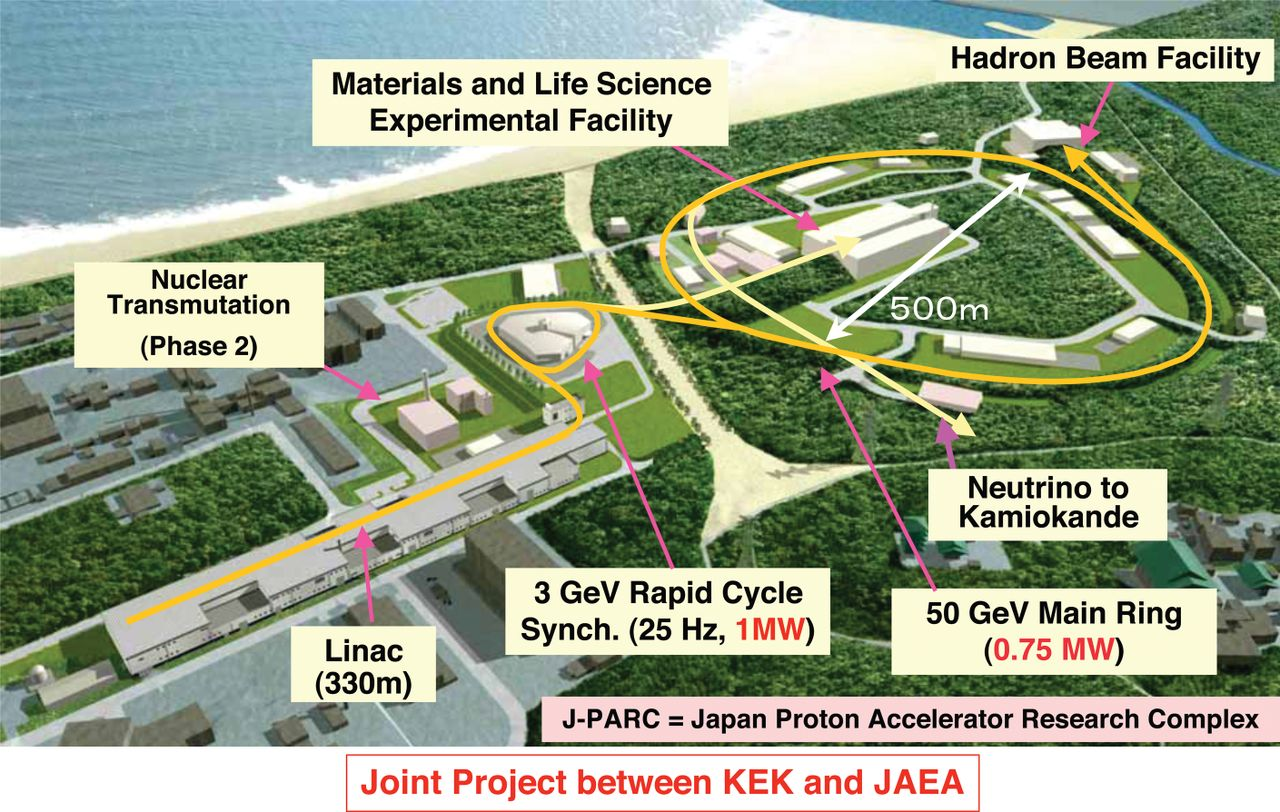
Bird's-eye view of the entire facility

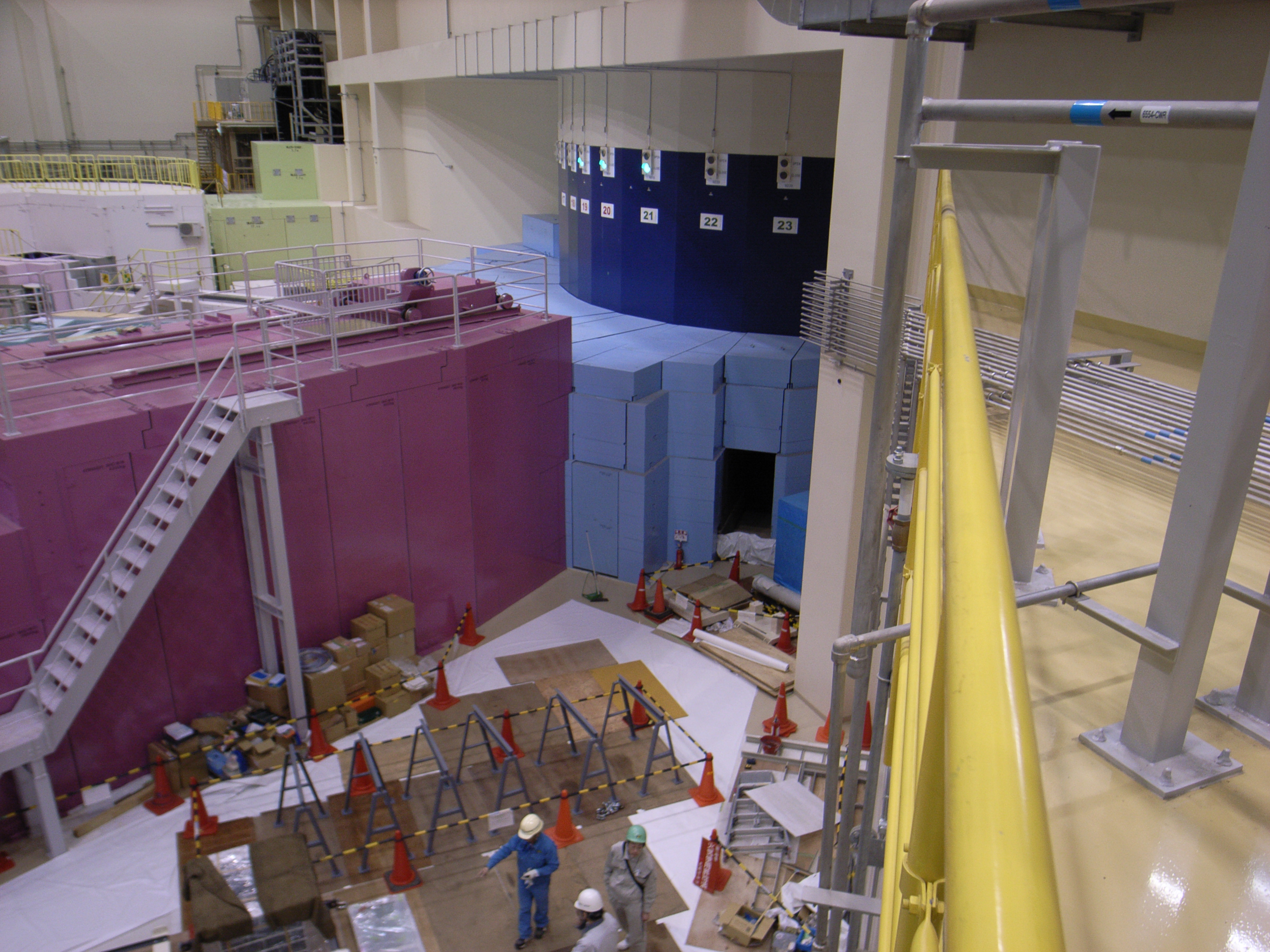
MLF Experimental Hall, J-PARC

J-PARC includes three main parts: the 400 MeV proton linear accelerator, the 3 GeV Rapid Cycling Synchrotron (RCS), and the 30 GeV Main Ring (MR) synchrotron. There are two main experimental areas: the Materials and Life Science Experimental Facility (MLF), where the proton beam from the RCS is used to create beams of either neutrons or muons for further study, and the Hadron Facility (HD), where the beam from the main ring is used to create heavy hadronic particles such as pions and kaons. The main ring beam is also used to create neutrino beams for analysis at the Kamioka laboratory, located approximately 300 km to the west. A planned project also allow for research into accelerator-driven nuclear waste transmutation.

== See also ==
- T2K experiment
- Super-Kamiokande
- Hyper-Kamiokande
- Biological small-angle scattering
- China Spallation Neutron Source
- European Spallation Source
- Inelastic neutron scattering
- Neutron diffraction
- Neutron spin echo
- Polymer physics
- Protein dynamics
- Reptation
- Soft matter
- Spallation Neutron Source
- Spin echo
