= China Spallation Neutron Source =

Neutron source under construction in Dongguan, China

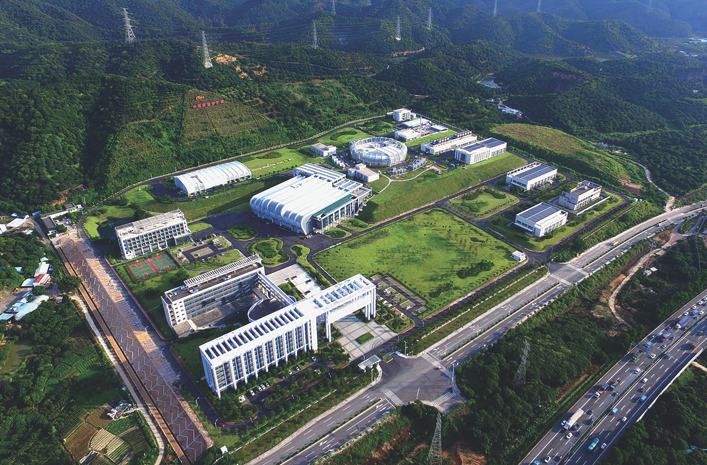
Bird view of China Spallation Neutron Source

The China Spallation Neutron Source is an accelerator-based neutron source, operated by the Institute of High Energy Physics, at Dongguan in Guangdong province - the first major scientific facility in south China. The project was approved by Chinese central government in 2005. Construction began 20 October 2011, with commissioning planned for 2016, and operation in 2018.

The source contains a proton synchrotron fed by a linear accelerator; short (<500ns) pulses of 1.63×10^{13} 1.6 GeV protons are extracted from the synchrotron 25 times a second; these pulses strike a tungsten-metal target (cooled with heavy water) to produce energetic neutrons, which are reduced to scientifically interesting energies by a variety of moderators.

The intended budget for the project is 1.5 billion CNY; this limits the initial power of the machine to about 120 kW, but it has been designed so that its power can readily be quadrupled if more funding becomes available, by upgrading the linear accelerator and the RF components of the synchrotron.

In March 2018, the China Spallation Neutron Source project was completed. In August 2018, the project passed the national acceptance. At the end of September 2018, the China Spallation Neutron Source was opened to domestic and foreign users.

== Phase II (500KW) ==
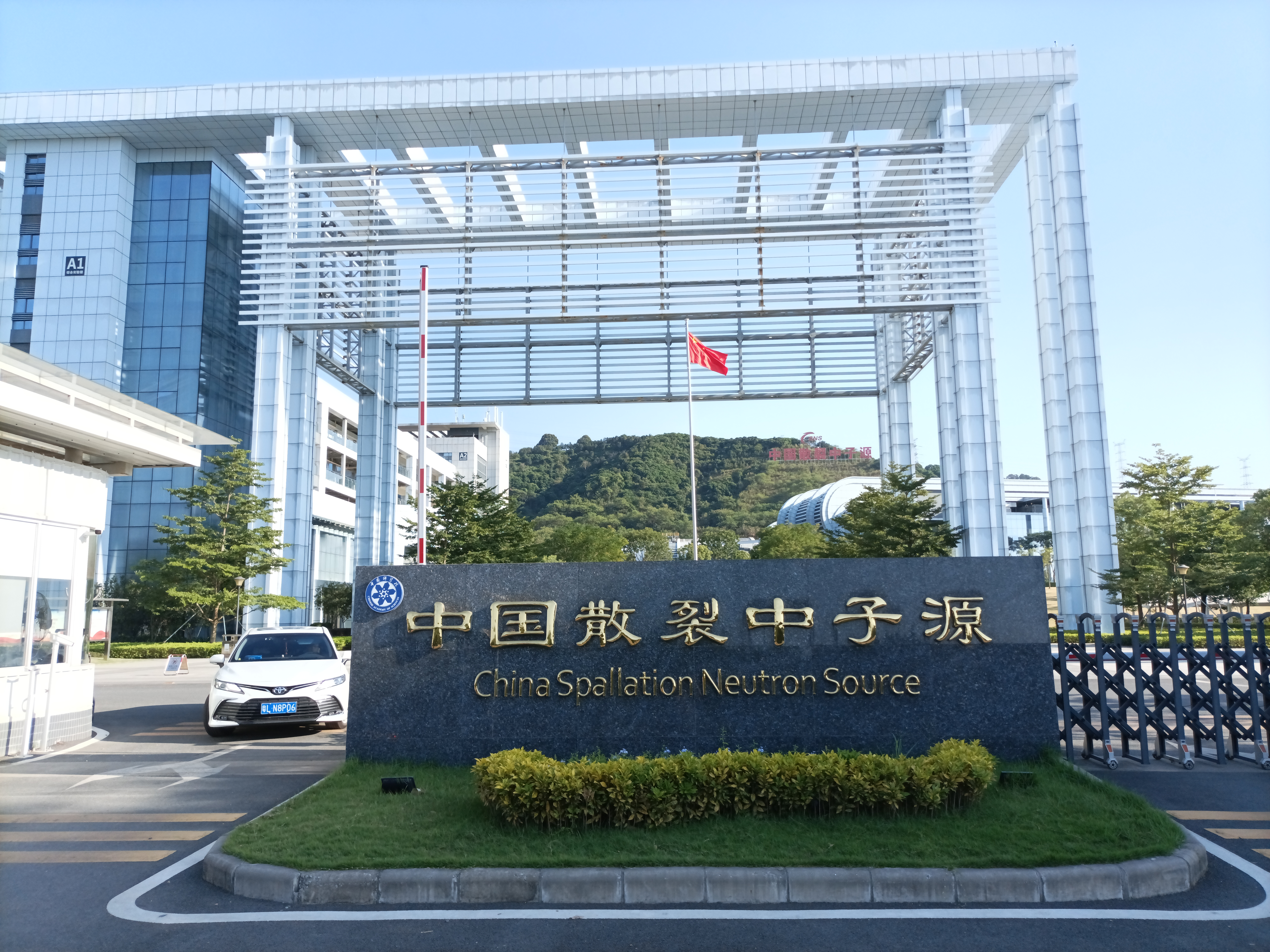
China Spallation Neutron Source in 2022

On December 26, 2022, the National Development and Reform Commission approved the feasibility study report for the Phase-II of the China Spallation Neutron Source (CSNS) project. The Phase-II of the project will build 11 neutron spectrometer terminals and increase the beam power of the accelerator and target station to 500 kW, with an estimated investment of RMB 3 billion. The upgrade will allow the CSNS to test smaller samples, improve experimental accuracy, and speed up data collection time. On March 30, 2024, the Phase-II of the CSNS project was launched and is expected to be completed in August 2026.

=== Improvement history ===
In February 2020, the target beam power of the spallation neutron source reached the originally designed 100kW; in February 2022, the target beam power was increased to 125kW; in September 2022, the target beam power was further increased to 140kW; and in March 2024, the target beam power was further increased to 160kW.

On October 21, 2024, the beam power of the spallation neutron source was increased to 170kW, which not only improved the efficiency of the device, but also verified the technical route used for the second phase beam power increase of the spallation neutron source. On March 4, 2026, the beam power was increased to 185kW.

== Applications ==
=== Medical Breakthroughs in Cancer Terminator ===
The most visible application of CSNS technology is in Boron Neutron Capture Therapy (BNCT).

- Clinical Success: In early 2026, clinical trials using CSNS-derived accelerator technology reported that a patient with recurrent nasopharyngeal carcinoma (NPC) achieved complete tumor remission (disappearance of the tumor in imaging) after just one treatment session.
- Domestic Boron Drug: China’s first domestically produced boron drug reached Phase II multi-center clinical trials in early 2026. This allows for a full "device-plus-drug" domestic industrial chain, expected to receive formal NMPA market approval by late 2026 or early 2027.
- Isotope Production: CSNS is now being used to mass-produce rare medical isotopes like Actinium-225 (225Ac) and Radium-223, which are essential for targeted alpha-particle therapy in late-stage prostate and bone cancers.

=== Energy ===
Neutrons are uniquely capable of "seeing" light elements like Lithium and Hydrogen inside dense metal containers, making CSNS the premier lab for the energy transition.

- Solid-State Batteries: In late 2025 and early 2026, researchers at CSNS successfully mapped the real-time movement of lithium ions in all-solid-state batteries during rapid charging. This data has helped Chinese battery manufacturers improve the cycle life of solid-state cells by nearly 30%.
- Hydrogen Storage: CSNS instruments (specifically the Multi-Physics Spectrometer) are used to study new magnesium-based materials that can store hydrogen safely at room temperature, a key requirement for the hydrogen-powered heavy trucking industry.

=== High-End Manufacturing & Aerospace ===
Residual Stress Mapping: CSNS is the only facility in the region capable of measuring internal "residual stress" deep within massive components without destroying them.

- Aviation: It is used to test the safety of 3D-printed titanium alloy parts for the COMAC C929 (China’s wide-body jet), ensuring no microscopic cracks exist within the engine mounts.
- Deep-Sea Exploration: Helped optimize the durability of the "Meng Xiang" (Dream) ocean-drilling vessel’s drill bits, allowing them to withstand the extreme pressures of the Earth's mantle (up to 11km deep).

=== New Materials & Quantum Science ===
- Extreme Low-Temperature Alloys: Research published in late 2025 using CSNS data revealed a new class of "high-entropy alloys" that become stronger and more ductile the colder they get. These materials are now being applied in liquid hydrogen transport tanks.
- Quantum Magnetism: CSNS has become a global hub for studying "Quantum Spin Liquids," a state of matter that could be the foundation for future fault-tolerant quantum computers.

== See also ==
- Biological small-angle scattering
- European Spallation Source
- Inelastic neutron scattering
- J-PARC
- Neutron diffraction
- Neutron spin echo
- Protein dynamics
- Soft matter
- Spallation Neutron Source
- Spin echo
