= 1971 Kurchatov Institute criticality accidents =

Nuclear accidents in the Soviet Union

In 1971, two criticality accidents occurred at the Kurchatov Institute of Moscow during nuclear reactor reactivity experiments. An incident in February resulted from improper safety procedures and a failure to calculate experimental parameters, resulting in the serious injury of two scientists. An incident in May occurred when improper reactor design and the improper use of an emergency relief valve resulted in the bottom falling out of a reactor, causing a prompt criticality that killed two and seriously injured two others. Both accidents stemmed in part from improper management of reactor water; the first experiment added water erroneously, while the second removed water too quickly. The accidents were kept secret until after the fall of the Soviet Union.

== February 15, 1971 ==
At the SF-7 criticality facility, researchers were testing the difference in reactivity in a reactor design caused by using iron or beryllium neutron reflectors. The fuel rods were enriched to 20% uranium-235, a typical composition for nuclear-powered icebreakers. Two prior experiments had been run with uneven radial spacing of neutron poisons, with one using iron reflectors, and one with beryllium reflectors, which had shown that the reactor was not critical in either configuration, and that there was little difference between iron and beryllium.

A new experiment was to be carried out, in which the outer ring of fuel rods would not have any neutron poison. Because there had been little difference in reactivity in the first experiment between iron and beryllium, only the reactivity of an iron reflector was calculated for this new configuration. Later calculations would show that the beryllium was about 10% more reactive in this configuration than iron. The beryllium test was to be carried out first because it was still in the reactor core from the prior experiment. On the morning of February 15, D. A. Mastin, head of the experimental team, arrived early. Without the control operator or control physicist on duty, Mastin activated a pump to fill the reactor with water. Water is a neutron moderator which increases the reactivity of a reactor. No immediate accident occurred, and business continued as usual. Trainee scientist R. A. Lednev walked over to Mastin and began chatting.

While water continued flowing into the reactor, and as Mastin and Lednev were conversing, they suddenly saw the blue glow of Cherenkov radiation, and a neutron flux alarm sounded. The reactor had gone critical. Mastin, Lednev, and the remaining staff fled the room, initially believing an accident had occurred in an adjacent area. They informed the facility manager, who attempted to enter the room to shut off the pump, but was prevented by the high radiation and clouds of steam filling the room.

The reactor's first criticality vaporized some of the water in the reactor, thereby reducing reactivity and stopping the reaction. But the water pump remained on. Thus, the reactor quickly filled up to the level of criticality once more. A cycle began, whereby the reactor would fill to the point of criticality, vaporize the water, go subcritical, and again fill with water to criticality. The cycle occurred some 50 times before workers cut external power to the facility about 7 minutes later, thereby shutting off pump power.

Mastin (who had originally decided it was unnecessary to re-calculate the reactivity of beryllium) and Lednev both received serious localized doses of radiation due to prompt ionizing radiation. While their whole-body exposure was low, they had received 1500 Rad (15 Gray) to their feet. For comparison, a whole body dose of 1000 Rad (10 Gy) is generally lethal. Both men survived, but one of them had to have their feet amputated. The remaining staff in the room received only minor doses, as they had been behind shielding. No release of radioactive material occurred, as the heating cycle was too short to burst the fuel rods.

== May 26, 1971 ==
Due to Soviet-era secrecy, news of the first accident was kept secret even among the other scientists of the facility, and reactivity experiments continued. At the SF-3 facility, researchers were testing how the presence of hydrogen affected reactivity. The experiment was designed to use highly enriched 90% U235. The ratio of uranium to hydrogen was controlled by changing the mechanical pitch of reactor rods within each hexahedral fuel rod bundle. The reactor base was supported by a sheet of 20 mm (0.79 in) plexiglass—an atypical reactor component chosen for its similar hydrogen content to water. Each experiment was carried out at a different pitch, in which rods were added one at a time until the reactor reached criticality.

In the most reactive configuration (14.4 mm (0.57 in) pitch over a 1.2 m (3.9 ft) reactor height), it had taken only 260 rods to reach criticality. In the last experiment, at a pitch of 7.2 mm (0.28 in), it took 1,790 rods to reach criticality. The experiment reached criticality safely, and was ordered to be shut down. Control rods were inserted and the neutron source was removed; the reaction was stopped. Four staff entered the reactor area to examine it.

The reactor had two ways to be drained of water. One was using a slow valve (which took 15 to 20 minutes), and the other was a fast valve, which took less than 30 seconds. The prior tests had been drained using the slow valve. While the four staff were near the reactor, B. Erofeev, head of the experimental team, ordered the experiment drained using the fast valve. The sudden rush of water put significant suction pressure on the relatively fragile plexiglass plate, pulling it downward. The fuel rod bundles were now unsupported and tumbled into the bottom of the reactor.

The 1,790 jumbled rods were then at a much more ideal pitch—far exceeding the minimum 260 rods needed for criticality—and achieved prompt criticality. About 160 MJ (44.4 kilowatt-hours equivalent) of energy was released. Water splashed out of the reactor, and some fuel rods melted. Either due to loss of water or fuel rod destruction, the reaction stopped shortly after.

The four personnel inside the critical assembly room were seriously irradiated. Erofeev, who ordered the fateful action, received 2000 Rad (20 Gray) and died 15 days later. Technician I. I. Vasil’ev received 6000 Rad (60 Gray) and died 5 days later. For comparison, a 30 Gy dose is universally fatal. Two other personnel survived despite doses of 700–800 Rad (7–8 Gy). For comparison, more than 75% of those who receive a 6 Gy dose die. The reactor room was minorly contaminated due to fuel rod melting, but the facility and surrounding area were uncontaminated.

== Aftermath ==
The accidents were both kept secret from Institute personnel and from the public, although rumours circulated that there had been an accident at Kurchatov in the 1970s. The details were not disclosed until the late 1990s, well after the fall of the Soviet Union.

After the second accident, the Institute instituted new safety rules, including requiring procedures for every part of a test and requiring written permission to deviate from that procedure.
