= NPDGamma experiment =

NPDGamma is an ongoing effort to measure the parity-violating asymmetry in polarized cold neutron capture on parahydrogen.

$$\vec n + p \to d + \gamma$$

Polarized neutrons of energies 2 meV – 15 meV are incident on a liquid parahydrogen target. The neutrons are captured, forming deuterium and releasing a gamma ray with an energy of 2.2 MeV (the binding energy of deuterium), which is subsequently detected. The detector array consists of 4 rings of 12 detectors each, where each ring is concentric around the neutron beam. The polarization of the incoming neutron beam is alternated rapidly to study the spin correlation of the direction of the emitted gamma ray.

The measured quantity is the difference in the number of gamma rays emitted within a solid angle between the two neutron spin states. This difference (divided by the sum) forms an asymmetry with possible parity-violating and parity-conserving components, where the former is known as $A_\gamma$. By studying the parity-violating correlation between the spin of the incoming neutron (its polarization) and the direction of the emitted gamma ray, one primarily probes $h_\pi$ (traditionally known as $f_\pi$), the long-range coupling constant used to describe the hadronic weak interaction.

The first phase of the NPDGamma experiment was carried out at Los Alamos National Lab in 2006, but did not have the statistical sensitivity to test theoretical predictions ($A_\gamma=O\left(10^{-8}\right)$).

The current phase of the NPDGamma experiment is running at the Spallation Neutron Source at Oak Ridge National Lab. Production data began in the spring of 2012.

In 2018 the NPDGamma collaboration reported a successful measurement of parity violation.
