= International Thorium Energy Committee =

- Abbreviation: iThEC
- Formation: 2012
- Founder: Carlo Rubbia
- Founded at: CERN, Geneva
- Purpose: To promote the cause of using thorium as a means of reducing existing and future nuclear waste, and for generating electricity

The international Thorium Energy Committee (iThEC) was founded in late 2012 at CERN in Geneva by scientists, engineers, political figures and industrialists under the leadership of its honorary president Carlo Rubbia, to promote the cause of using thorium as a means of reducing existing and future nuclear waste, and also for generating electricity.

== International conference ==
After its founding, the first action of the committee was to organise an international conference on Thorium, ThEC13, using mostly private funding and institutional support from CERN. The conference lasted four days and attracted wide support from research institutes, energy companies and private individuals who contributed to the establishment of the current state-of-the-art in Thorium technology. Amongst the many contributions to the conference, one may note the announcement of the decision by the companies Solvay and Areva to jointly fund research in Thorium development and the tests by the Norwegian company Thor energy of Thorium fuel rods in the Halden Reactor.

== Expansion ==
The Committee is expanding its membership to reach a wider audience and attracted to the ThEC13 conference keynote speakers such as Pascal Couchepin, former president of the Swiss confederation and member of the Liberal Party of Switzerland and Hans Blix, former head of the International Atomic Energy Agency.

== See also ==
- Subcritical reactor
- Thorium Energy Alliance
- Thorium fuel cycle
- Thorium-based nuclear power
