= Project PACER =

1970s American fusion power project

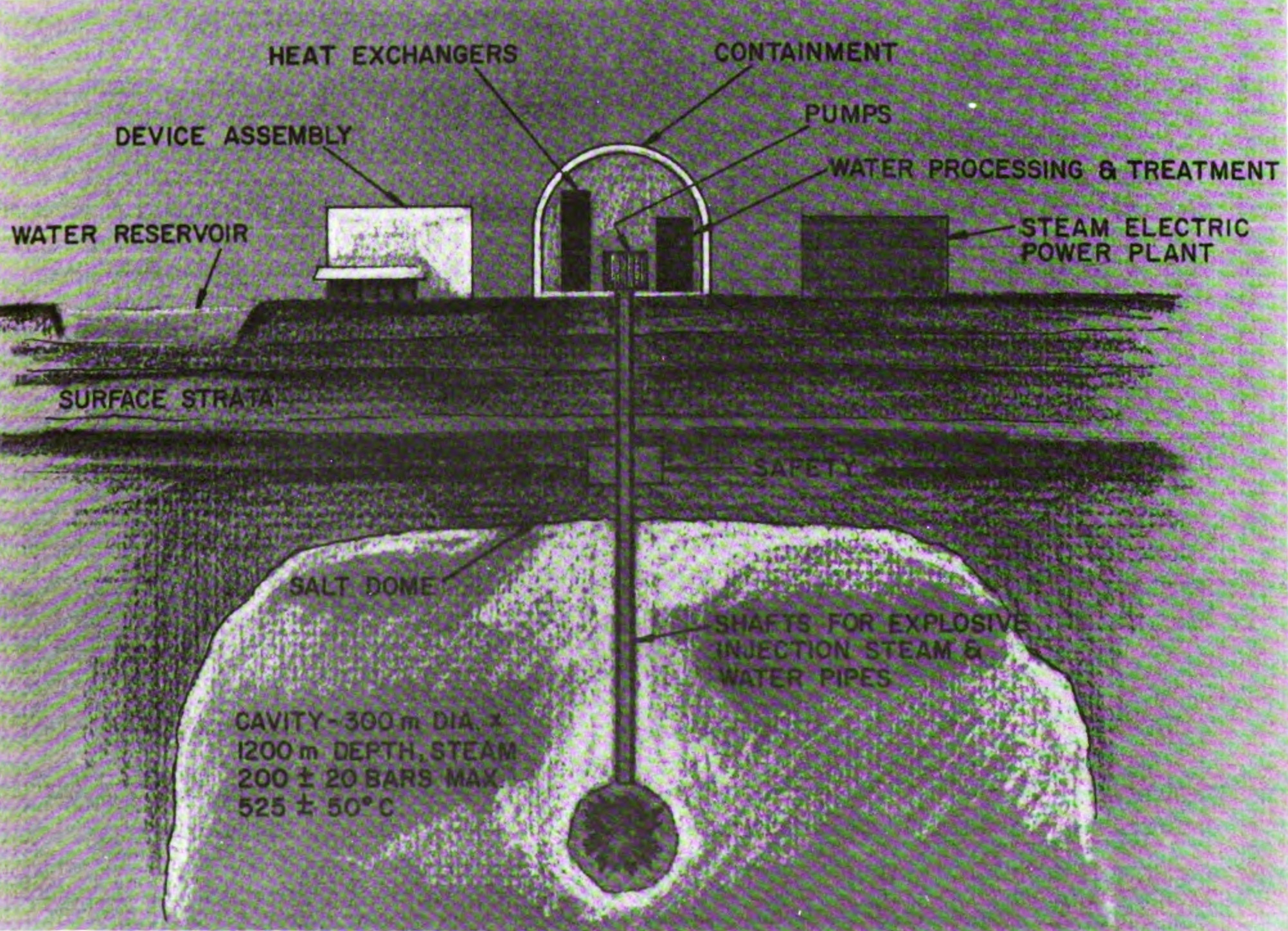
Pacer fusion energy concept showing salt cavern where thermonuclear explosives are dropped to boil water and run a turbine

Project PACER, carried out at Los Alamos National Laboratory (LANL) in the mid-1970s, explored the possibility of a fusion power system that would involve exploding small hydrogen bombs (fusion bombs)—or, as stated in a later proposal, fission bombs—inside an underground cavity. Its proponents claimed that the system is the only fusion power system that could be demonstrated to work using existing technology. It would also require a continuous supply of nuclear explosives and contemporary economics studies demonstrated that these could not be produced at a competitive price compared to conventional energy sources.

== Development ==
The earliest references to the use of nuclear explosions for power generation date to a meeting called by Edward Teller in 1957. Among the many topics covered, the group considered power generation by exploding 1-megaton bombs in a 1,000-foot (300 m) diameter steam-filled cavity dug in granite. This led to the realization that the fissile material from the fission sections of the bombs, the "primaries", would accumulate in the chamber. Even at this early stage, physicist John Nuckolls became interested in designs of very small bombs, and ones with no fission primary at all. This work would later lead to his development of the inertial fusion energy concept.

The initial PACER proposals were studied under the larger Project Plowshares's efforts in the United States, which examined the use of nuclear explosions in place of chemical ones for construction. Examples included the possibility of using large nuclear devices to create an artificial harbour for mooring ships in the north, or as a sort of nuclear fracking to improve natural gas yields. Another proposal would create an alternative to the Panama Canal in a single sequence of detonations, crossing a Central American nation. One of these tests, 1961's Project Gnome, also considered the generation of steam for possible extraction as a power source. LANL proposed PACER as an adjunct to these studies.

Early examples considered 1,000-foot (300 m) diameter water-filled caverns created in salt domes at as much as 5,000 feet (1,500 m) deep. A series of 50-kiloton bombs would be dropped into the cavern and exploded to heat the water and create steam. The steam would then power a secondary cooling loop for power extraction using a steam turbine. Dropping about two bombs a day would cause the system to reach thermal equilibrium, allowing the continual extraction of about 2 GW of electrical power. There was also some consideration given to adding thorium or other material to the bombs to breed fuel for conventional fission reactors.

In a 1975 review of the various Plowshares efforts, the Gulf University Research Consortium (GURC) considered the economics of the PACER concept. They demonstrated that assuming a cost of $42 000 for the 50kT nuclear explosives would be the equivalent of fuelling a conventional light-water reactor with uranium fuel at a price of $27 per pound for yellowcake (equivalent to $162 in 2025). If the cost of the explosives would be $400 000 it would be equivalent to a pressurized water reactor with an equivalent price of $328 per ton of uranium (equivalent to $1,963 in 2025). The price for 1 pound of yellowcake was around $45 in 2012 (equivalent to $63 in 2025). The report also noted the problems with any program that generated large numbers of nuclear bombs, saying it was "bound to be controversial" and that it would "arouse considerable negative responses". GURC concluded that the likelihood of PACER being developed was very low, even if the formidable technical issues could be solved. In 1975 further funding for PACER research was cancelled.

Despite the cancellation of this early work, basic studies of the concept have continued. A more developed version considered the use of engineered vessels in place of the large open cavities. A typical design called for a 13-foot (4 m) thick steel alloy blast-chamber, 100 feet (30 m) in diameter and 330 feet (100 m) tall, to be embedded in a cavity dug into bedrock in Nevada. Hundreds of 50-foot (15 m) long bolts were to be driven into the surrounding rock to support the cavity. The space between the blast-chamber and the rock cavity walls was to be filled with concrete; then the bolts were to be put under enormous tension to pre-stress the rock, concrete, and blast-chamber. The blast-chamber was then to be partially filled with molten fluoride salts to a depth of 100 feet (30 m), a "waterfall" would be initiated by pumping the salt to the top of the chamber and letting it fall to the bottom. While surrounded by this falling coolant, a 1-kiloton fission bomb would be detonated; this would be repeated every 45 minutes. The fluid would also absorb neutrons to avoid damage to the walls of the cavity.

== See also ==
- Nuclear pulse propulsion
- Project Gnome
- Nuclear fusion-fission hybrid
