= Subcritical reactor =

Device that achieves nuclear fission without triggering a chain reaction

A subcritical reactor is a nuclear fission reactor concept that produces fission without achieving criticality. Instead of sustaining a chain reaction, a subcritical reactor uses additional neutrons from an outside source. There are two general classes of such devices. One uses neutrons provided by a nuclear fusion machine, a concept known as a fusion–fission hybrid. The other uses neutrons created through spallation of heavy nuclei by charged particles such as protons accelerated by a particle accelerator, a concept known as an accelerator-driven system (ADS) or accelerator-driven sub-critical reactor.

== Motivation ==
A subcritical reactor can be used to destroy heavy isotopes contained in the used fuel from a conventional nuclear reactor, while at the same time producing electricity. The long-lived transuranic elements in nuclear waste can in principle be fissioned, releasing energy in the process and leaving behind the fission products which are shorter-lived. This would shorten considerably the time for disposal of radioactive waste. However, some isotopes have threshold fission cross sections and therefore require a fast reactor for being fissioned. While they can be transmuted into fissile material with thermal neutrons, some nuclides need as many as three successive neutron capture reactions to reach a fissile isotope and then yet another neutron to fission. Also, they release on average too few new neutrons per fission, so that with a fuel containing a high fraction of them, criticality cannot be reached. The accelerator-driven reactor is independent of this parameter and thus can utilize these nuclides. The three most important long-term radioactive isotopes that could advantageously be handled that way are neptunium-237, americium-241 and americium-243. The nuclear weapon material plutonium-239 is also suitable although it can be expended in a cheaper way as MOX fuel or inside existing fast reactors.

Besides nuclear waste incineration, there is interest in this type reactor because it is perceived as inherently safe, unlike a conventional reactor. In most types of critical reactors, there exist circumstances in which the rate of fission can increase rapidly, damaging or destroying the reactor and allowing the escape of radioactive material (see SL-1 or Chernobyl disaster). With a subcritical reactor, the reaction will cease unless continually fed neutrons from an outside source. However, the problem of heat generation even after ending the chain reaction remains, so that continuous cooling of such a reactor for a considerable period after shut-down remains vital in order to avoid overheating. However, even the issue of decay heat can be minimized as a subcritical reactor needn't assemble a critical mass of fissile material and can thus be built (nearly) arbitrarily small and thus reduce the required thermal mass of an emergency coolant system capable of absorbing all heat generated in the hours to days after a scram.

=== Delayed neutrons ===
Another issue in which a subcritical reactor is different from a "normal" nuclear reactor (no matter whether it operates with fast or thermal neutrons) is that all "normal" nuclear power plants rely on delayed neutrons to maintain safe operating conditions. Depending on the fissioning nuclide, a bit under 1% of neutrons aren't released immediately upon fission (prompt neutrons) but rather with fractions of seconds to minutes of delay by fission products which beta decay followed by neutron emission. Those delayed neutrons are essential for reactor control as the time between fission "generations" is on such a short order of magnitude that macroscopic physical processes or human intervention cannot keep a power excursion under control. However, as only the delayed neutrons provide enough neutrons to maintain criticality, the reaction times become several orders of magnitude larger and reactor control becomes feasible. By contrast this means that too low a fraction of delayed neutrons makes an otherwise fissile material unsuitable for operating a "conventional" nuclear power plant. Conversely, a subcritical reactor actually has slightly improved properties with a fuel with low delayed neutron fractions. (See below). It just so happens that while ^{235}U the currently most used fissile material has a relatively high delayed neutron fraction, ^{239}Pu has a much lower one, which - in addition to other physical and chemical properties - limits the possible plutonium content in "normal" reactor fuel. For this reason spent MOX-fuel, which still contains significant amounts of plutonium (including fissile ^{239}Pu and - when "fresh" - ^{241}Pu) is usually not reprocessed due to the ingrowth of non-fissile ^{240}Pu which would require a higher plutonium content in fuel manufactured from this plutonium to maintain criticality. The other main component of spent fuel - reprocessed uranium - is usually only recovered as a byproduct and fetches worse prices on the uranium market than natural uranium due to ingrowth of ^{236}U and other "undesirable" isotopes of uranium.

== Principle ==
Most current ADS designs propose a high-intensity proton accelerator with an energy of about 1 GeV, directed towards a spallation target or spallation neutron source. The source located in the heart of the reactor core contains liquid metal which is impacted by the beam, thus releasing neutrons and is cooled by circulating the liquid metal such as lead-bismuth towards a heat exchanger. The nuclear reactor core surrounding the spallation neutron source contains the fuel rods, the fuel being any fissile or fertile actinide mix, but preferable already with a certain amount of fissile material to not have to run at zero criticality during startup. Thereby, for each proton intersecting the spallation target, an average of 20 neutrons is released which fission the surrounding fissile part of the fuel and transmute atoms in the fertile part, "breeding" new fissile material. If the value of 20 neutrons per GeV expended is assumed, one neutron "costs" 50 MeV while fission (which requires one neutron) releases on the order of 200 MeV per actinide atom that is split. Efficiency can be increased by reducing the energy needed to produce a neutron, increasing the share of usable energy extracted from the fission (if a thermal process is used Carnot efficiency dictates that higher temperatures are needed to increase efficiency) and finally by getting criticality ever closer to 1 while still staying below it. An important factor in both efficiency and safety is how subcritical the reactor is. To simplify, the value of k(effective) that is used to give the criticality of a reactor (including delayed neutrons) can be interpreted as how many neutrons of each "generation" fission further nuclei. If k(effective) is 1, for every 1000 neutrons introduced, 1000 neutrons are produced that also fission further nuclei. Obviously the reaction rate would steadily increase in that case due to more and more neutrons being delivered from the neutron source. If k(effective) is just below 1, few neutrons have to be delivered from outside the reactor to keep the reaction at a steady state, increasing efficiency. On the other hand, in the extreme case of "zero criticality", that is k(effective)=0 (e.g. If the reactor is run for transmutation alone) all neutrons are "consumed" and none are produced inside the fuel. However, as neutronics can only ever be known to a certain degree of precision, the reactor must in practice allow a safety margin below criticality that depends on how well the neutronics are known and on the effect of the ingrowth of nuclides that decay via neutron emitting spontaneous fission such as Californium-252 or of nuclides that decay via neutron emission.

The neutron balance can be regulated or indeed shut off by adjusting the accelerator power so that the reactor would be below criticality. The additional neutrons provided by the spallation neutron source provide the degree of control as do the delayed neutrons in a conventional nuclear reactor, the difference being that spallation neutron source-driven neutrons are easily controlled by the accelerator. The main advantage is inherent safety. A conventional nuclear reactor's nuclear fuel possesses self-regulating properties such as the Doppler effect or void effect, which make these nuclear reactors safe. In addition to these physical properties of conventional reactors, in the subcritical reactor, whenever the neutron source is turned off, the fission reaction ceases and only the decay heat remains.

The principle of operation of an accelerator-driven reactor

== Technical challenges ==
There are technical difficulties to overcome before ADS can become economical and eventually be integrated into future nuclear waste management. The accelerator must provide a high intensity and also be highly reliable - each outage of the accelerator in addition to causing a scram will put the system under immense thermal stress. There are concerns about the window separating the protons from the spallation target, which is expected to be exposed to stress under extreme conditions. However, recent experience with the MEGAPIE liquid metal neutron spallation source tested at the Paul Scherrer Institute has demonstrated a working beam window under a 0.78 MW intense proton beam. The chemical separation of the transuranic elements and the fuel manufacturing, as well as the structure materials, are important issues. Finally, the lack of nuclear data at high neutron energies limits the efficiency of the design. This latter issue can be overcome by introducing a neutron moderator between the neutron source and the fuel, but this can lead to increased leakage as the moderator will also scatter neutrons away from the fuel. Changing the geometry of the reactor can reduce but never eliminate leakage. Leaking neutrons are also of concern due to the activation products they produce and due to the physical damage to materials neutron irradiation can cause. Furthermore, there are certain advantages to the fast neutron spectrum which cannot be achieved with thermal neutrons as are the result of a moderator. On the other hand, thermal neutron reactors are the most common and well understood type of nuclear reactor and thermal neutrons also have advantages over fast neutrons.

Some laboratory experiments and many theoretical studies have demonstrated the theoretical possibility of such a plant. Carlo Rubbia, a nuclear physicist, Nobel laureate, and former director of CERN, was one of the first to conceive a design of a subcritical reactor, the so-called "energy amplifier". In 2005, several large-scale projects are going on in Europe and Japan to further develop subcritical reactor technology. In 2012 CERN scientists and engineers launched the International Thorium Energy Committee (iThEC), an organization dedicated to pursuing this goal and which organized the ThEC13 conference on the subject.

== Economics and public acceptance ==
Subcritical reactors have been proposed both as a means of generating electric power and as a means of transmutation of nuclear waste, so the gain is twofold. However, the costs for construction, safety and maintenance of such complex installations are expected to be very high, not to mention the amount of research needed to develop a practical design (see above). There exist cheaper and reasonably safe waste management concepts, such as the transmutation in fast-neutron reactors. However, the solution of a subcritical reactor might be favoured for a better public acceptance – it is considered more acceptable to burn the waste than to bury it for hundreds of thousands of years. For future waste management, a few transmutation devices could be integrated into a large-scale nuclear program, hopefully increasing only slightly the overall costs.

The main challenge facing partitioning and transmutation operations is the need to enter nuclear cycles of extremely long duration: about 200 years. Another disadvantage is the generation of high quantities of intermediate-level long-lived radioactive waste (ILW) which will also require deep geological disposal to be safely managed. A more positive aspect is the expected reduction in size of the repository, which was estimated to be an order of 4 to 6. Both positive and negative aspects were examined in an international benchmark study coordinated by Forschungszentrum Jülich and financed by the European Union.

== Subcritical hybrid systems ==
While ADS was originally conceptualized as a part of a light water reactor design, other proposals have been made that incorporate an ADS into other generation IV reactor concepts.

One such proposal calls for a gas-cooled fast reactor that is fueled primarily by plutonium and americium. The neutronic properties of americium make it difficult to use in any critical reactor, because it tends to make the moderator temperature coefficient more positive, decreasing stability. The inherent safety of an ADS, however, would allow americium to be safely burned. These materials also have good neutron economy, allowing the pitch-to-diameter ratio to be large, which allows for improved natural circulation and economics.

== Muon-driven systems for nuclear waste disposal ==
Subcritical methods for use in nuclear waste disposal that do not rely on neutron sources are also being developed. These include systems that rely on the mechanism of muon capture, in which muons (μ^{−}) produced by a compact accelerator-driven source transmute long-lived radioactive isotopes to stable isotopes.

== Natural ==
Generally the term "subcritical reactor" is reserved for artificial systems, but natural systems do exist—any natural source of fissile material exposed to cosmic and gamma rays (from even the sun) could be considered a subcritical reactor. This includes space launched satellites with radioisotope thermoelectric generators as well as any such exposed reservoirs.

== See also ==
- Alternative energy
- Cosmic ray spallation
- Spallation Neutron Source
- ISIS neutron source
- Hybrid nuclear fusion
- MYRRHA
