= Nuclear fusion–fission hybrid =

Proposed uses of generating power from nuclear fission and fusion

Hybrid nuclear fusion–fission (hybrid nuclear power) is a proposed means of generating power by use of a combination of nuclear fusion and fission processes.

The basic idea is to use high-energy fast neutrons from a fusion reactor to trigger fission in non-fissile fuels like ^{238}U or ^{232}Th. Each neutron can trigger several fission events, multiplying the energy released by each fusion reaction hundreds of times. As the fission fuel is not fissile, there is no self-sustaining chain reaction from fission. This would not only make fusion designs more economical in power terms, but also be able to burn fuels that were not suitable for use in conventional fission plants, even their nuclear waste.

In general terms, the hybrid is very similar in concept to the fast breeder reactor, which uses a compact high-energy fission core in place of the hybrid's fusion core. Another similar concept is the accelerator-driven subcritical reactor, which uses a particle accelerator to provide the neutrons instead of nuclear reactions.

== History ==
The concept dates to the 1950s, and was strongly advocated by Hans Bethe during the 1970s. At that time the first powerful fusion experiments were being built, but it would still be many years before they could be economically competitive. Hybrids were proposed as a way of greatly accelerating their market introduction, producing energy even before the fusion systems reached break-even. However, detailed studies of the economics of the systems suggested they could not compete with existing fission reactors.

The idea was abandoned and lay dormant until the continued delays in reaching break-even led to a brief revival of the concept around 2009. These studies generally concentrated on the nuclear waste disposal aspects of the design, as opposed to the production of energy. The concept has seen cyclical interest since then, based largely on the success or failure of more conventional solutions like the Yucca Mountain nuclear waste repository

Another major design effort for energy production was started at Lawrence Livermore National Laboratory (LLNL) under their LIFE program. Industry input led to the abandonment of the hybrid approach for LIFE, which was then re-designed as a pure-fusion system. LIFE was cancelled when the underlying technology, from the National Ignition Facility, failed to reach its design performance goals.

Apollo Fusion, a company founded by Google executive Mike Cassidy in 2017, was also reported to be focused on using the subcritical nuclear fusion-fission hybrid method. Their web site is now focussed on their Hall-effect thrusters, and mentions fusion only in passing.

On 2022, September 9, Professor Peng Xianjue of the Chinese Academy of Engineering Physics announced that the Chinese government had approved the construction of the world's largest pulsed-powerplant - the Z-FFR, namely Z(-pinch)-Fission-Fusion Reactor- in Chengdu, Sichuan province. Neutrons produced in a Z-pinch facility (endowed with cylindrical symmetry and fuelled with deuterium and tritium) will strike a coaxial blanket including both uranium and lithium isotopes. Uranium fission will boost the facility's overall heat output by 10 to 20 times. Interaction of lithium and neutrons will provide tritium for further fueling. Innovative, quasi-spherical geometry near the core of Z-FFR leads to high performance of Z-pinch discharge. According to Prof. Xianjue, this will considerably speed up the use of fusion energy and prepare it for commercial power production by 2035.

== Description ==
=== Fission basics ===
Conventional fission power systems rely on a chain reaction of nuclear fission events that release two or three neutrons that cause further fission events. By careful arrangement and the use of various absorber materials, the system can be set in a balance of released and absorbed neutrons, known as criticality.

Natural uranium is a mix of several isotopes, mainly a trace amount of ^{235}U and over 99% ^{238}U. When they undergo fission, both of these isotopes release fast neutrons with an energy distribution peaking around 1 to 2 MeV. This energy is too low to cause fission in ^{238}U, which means it cannot sustain a chain reaction. ^{235}U will undergo fission when struck by neutrons of this energy, so ^{235}U sustains a chain reaction. There are too few ^{235}U atoms in natural uranium to sustain a chain reaction, the atoms are spread out too far and the chance a neutron will hit one is too small. Chain reactions are accomplished by concentrating, or enriching, the fuel, increasing the amount of ^{235}U to produce enriched uranium, while the leftover, now mostly ^{238}U, is a waste product known as depleted uranium. ^{235}U will sustain a chain reaction if enriched to about 20% of the fuel mass.

^{235}U will undergo fission more easily if the neutrons are of lower energy, the so-called thermal neutrons. Neutrons can be slowed to thermal energies through collisions with a neutron moderator material, the easiest to use are the hydrogen atoms found in water. By placing the fission fuel in water, the probability that the neutrons will cause fission in another ^{235}U is greatly increased, which means the level of enrichment needed to reach criticality is greatly reduced. This leads to the concept of reactor-grade enriched uranium, with the amount of ^{235}U increased from just less than 1% in natural ore to between 3 and 5%, depending on the reactor design. This is in contrast to weapons-grade enrichment, which increases to the ^{235}U to at least 20%, and more commonly, over 90%.

To maintain criticality, the fuel has to retain that extra concentration of ^{235}U. A typical fission reactor burns off enough of the ^{235}U to cause the reaction to stop over a period on the order of a few months. A combination of burnup of the ^{235}U along with the creation of neutron absorbers, or poisons, as part of the fission process eventually results in the reactor not being able to maintain criticality. This burned-up fuel has to be removed and replaced with fresh fuel. The result is nuclear waste that is highly radioactive and filled with long-lived radionuclides that present a safety concern.

The waste contains most of the ^{235}U it started with, only 1% or so of the energy in the fuel has been extracted by the time it reaches the point where it is no longer fissile. One solution to this problem is to reprocess the fuel, which uses chemical processes to separate the ^{235}U (and other non-poison elements) from the waste, and then mixes the extracted ^{235}U in fresh fuel loads. This reduces the amount of new fuel that needs to be mined and also concentrates the unwanted portions of the waste into a smaller load. Reprocessing is expensive, however, and it has generally been more economical to simply buy fresh fuel from the mine.

Like ^{235}U, ^{239}Pu can maintain a chain reaction, so it is a useful reactor fuel. However, ^{239}Pu is not found in commercially useful amounts in nature. Another possibility is to breed ^{239}Pu from the ^{238}U through neutron capture, or various other means. This process only occurs with higher-energy neutrons than would be found in a moderated reactor, so a conventional reactor only produces small amounts of Pu when the neutron is captured within the fuel mass before it is moderated.

It is possible to build a reactor that does not require a moderator. To do so, the fuel has to be further enriched, to the point where the ^{235}U is common enough to maintain criticality even with fast neutrons. The extra fast neutrons escaping the fuel load can then be used to breed fuel in a ^{238}U assembly surrounding the reactor core, most commonly taken from the stocks of depleted uranium. ^{239}Pu can also be used for the core, which means once the system is up and running, it can be refuelled using the ^{239}Pu it creates, with enough left over to feed into other reactors as well. This concept is known as a breeder reactor.

Extracting the ^{239}Pu from the ^{238}U feedstock can be achieved with chemical processing, in the same fashion as normal reprocessing. The difference is that the mass will contain far fewer other elements, particularly some of the highly radioactive fission products found in normal nuclear waste.

=== Fusion basics ===
Fusion reactors typically burn a mixture of deuterium (D) and tritium (T). When heated to millions of degrees, the kinetic energy in the fuel begins to overcome the natural electrostatic repulsion between nuclei, the so-called Coulomb barrier, and the fuel begins to undergo fusion. This reaction gives off an alpha particle and a high-energy neutron of 14 MeV. A key requirement to the economic operation of a fusion reactor is that the alphas deposit their energy back into the fuel mix, heating it so that additional fusion reactions take place. This leads to a condition not unlike the chain reaction in the fission case, known as ignition.

Building a reactor design that is capable of reaching ignition has proven to be a significant problem. The first attempts to build such a reactor took place in 1938, and the first success was in 2022, 84 years later. Even in that case, the amount of energy released was orders of magnitude less than the energy needed to operate the machine. A reactor that produces more electricity than is used to operate it, a condition known as engineering breakeven, will require decades more work.

Additionally, there is an issue of fueling such a reactor. Deuterium can be obtained by the separation of hydrogen isotopes in seawater (see heavy water production). Tritium has a short half-life of 12.3 years, so only trace amounts are found in nature. To fuel the reactor, the neutrons from the reaction are used to breed more tritium through a reaction in a blanket of lithium surrounding the reaction chamber. Tritium breeding is key to the success of a D-T fusion cycle, and to date, this technique has not been demonstrated. Predictions based on computer modelling suggest that the breeding ratios are quite small and a fusion plant would barely cover its own use. Many years would be needed to breed enough surplus to start another reactor.

=== Hybrid concepts ===
Fusion–fission designs essentially replace the lithium blanket of a typical fusion design with a blanket of fission fuel, either natural uranium ore or even nuclear waste. The fusion neutrons have more than enough energy to cause fission in the ^{238}U, as well as many of the other elements in the fuel, including some of the transuranic waste elements. The reaction can continue even after all of the ^{235}U is burned off; the rate is controlled not by the neutrons from the fission events, but by the neutrons being supplied by the fusion reactor.

Fission occurs naturally because each event gives off more than one neutron capable of producing additional fission events. Fusion, at least in D-T fuel, gives off only one neutron, and that neutron cannot produce more fusion events. When that neutron strikes fissile material in the blanket, one of two reactions may occur. In many cases, the kinetic energy of the neutron will cause one or two neutrons to be struck out of the nucleus without causing fission. These neutrons still have enough energy to cause other fission events. In other cases, the neutron will be captured and cause fission, which will release two or three neutrons. This means that every fusion neutron in the fusion–fission design can result in anywhere between two and four neutrons in the fission fuel.

This is a key concept in the hybrid concept, known as fission multiplication. For every fusion event, several fission events may occur, each of which gives off much more energy than the original fusion, about 11 times. This greatly increases the total power output of the reactor. This has been suggested as a way to produce practical fusion reactors even though no fusion reactor has yet reached break-even, by multiplying the power output using cheap fuel or waste. However, many studies have repeatedly demonstrated that this only becomes practical when the overall reactor is very large, 2 to 3 GWt, which makes it expensive to build.

These processes also have the side-effect of breeding ^{239}Pu or ^{233}U, which can be removed and used as fuel in conventional fission reactors. This leads to an alternate design where the primary purpose of the fusion–fission reactor is to reprocess waste into new fuel. Although far less economical than chemical reprocessing, this process also burns off some of the nastier elements instead of simply physically separating them out. This also has advantages for non-proliferation, as enrichment and reprocessing technologies are also associated with nuclear weapons production. However, the cost of the nuclear fuel produced is very high and is unlikely to compete with conventional sources.

=== Neutron economy ===
A key issue for the fusion–fission concept is the number and lifetime of the neutrons in the various processes, the so-called neutron economy.

In a pure fusion design, the neutrons are used for breeding tritium in a lithium blanket. Natural lithium consists of about 92% ^{7}Li and the rest is mostly ^{6}Li. ^{7}Li breeding requires neutron energies even higher than those released by fission, around 5 MeV, well within the range of energies provided by fusion. This reaction produces tritium and helium-4, and another slow neutron. ^{6}Li can react with high or low energy neutrons, including those released by the ^{7}Li reaction. This means that a single fusion reaction can produce several tritiums, which is a requirement if the reactor is going to make up for natural decay and losses in the fusion processes.

When the lithium blanket is replaced, or supplemented, by fission fuel in the hybrid design, neutrons that react with the fissile material are no longer available for tritium breeding. The new neutrons released from the fission reactions can be used for this purpose, but only in ^{6}Li. One could process the lithium to increase the amount of ^{6}Li in the blanket, making up for these losses, but the downside to this process is that the ^{6}Li reaction only produces one tritium atom. Only the reaction between the high-energy fusion neutron and ^{7}Li can create more than one tritium, and this is essential for keeping the reactor running.

To address this issue, at least some of the fission neutrons must also be used for tritium breeding in ^{6}Li. Every neutron that does is no longer available for fission, reducing the reactor output. This requires a very careful balance if one wants the reactor to produce enough tritium to keep itself running, while also producing enough fission events to keep the fission side energy positive. If these cannot be accomplished simultaneously, there is no reason to build a hybrid. Even if this balance can be maintained, it might only occur at an economically infeasible level. For this reason, several neutron-releasing substances have been suggested as a way to multiply the number of neutrons available.

== Overall economy ==
Through the early development of the hybrid concept, the question of overall economics appeared difficult to answer. A series of studies starting in the late 1970s provided a much clearer picture of the hybrid in a complete fuel cycle and allowed the economics to be better understood. These studies indicated there was no reason to build a hybrid.

One of the most detailed of these studies was published in 1980 by Los Alamos National Laboratory (LANL). They noted that the hybrid would produce most of its energy indirectly, both through the fission events in the reactor, and much more by providing ^{239}Pu to fuel other fission reactors. In this overall picture, the hybrid is filling a role that is essentially identical to the breeder reactor. Both require chemical processing to remove the bred ^{239}Pu, both presented the same proliferation and safety risks as a result, and both produced about the same amount of fuel. Since the bred fuel is the primary source of energy in the overall cycle, the two systems were almost identical in the end.

What was not identical, however, was the technical maturity of the two designs. The hybrid would require considerable additional research and development before it would be known if it could ever work, and even if that were demonstrated, the result would be a system essentially identical to breeders which were already being built at that time. The report concluded:

The investment of time and money required to commercialize the hybrid cycle could only be justified by a real or perceived advantage of the hybrid over the classical FBR. Our analysis leads us to conclude that no such advantage exists. Therefore, there is not sufficient incentive to demonstrate and commercialize the fusion–fission hybrid.

== Rationale ==
The fusion process alone currently does not achieve sufficient gain (power output over power input) to be viable as a power source. By using the excess neutrons from the fusion reaction to in turn cause a high-yield fission reaction (close to 100%) in the surrounding subcritical fissionable blanket, the net yield from the hybrid fusion–fission process can provide a targeted gain of 100 to 300 times the input energy (an increase by a factor of three or four over fusion alone). Even allowing for high inefficiencies on the input side (i.e. low laser efficiency in ICF and Bremsstrahlung losses in Tokamak designs), this can still yield sufficient heat output for economical electric power generation. This can be seen as a shortcut to viable fusion power until more efficient pure fusion technologies can be developed, or as an end in itself to generate power, and also consume existing stockpiles of nuclear fissionables and waste products.

In the LIFE project at the Lawrence Livermore National Laboratory LLNL, using technology developed at the National Ignition Facility, the goal is to use fuel pellets of deuterium and tritium surrounded by a fissionable blanket to produce energy sufficiently greater than the input (laser) energy for electrical power generation. The principle involved is to induce inertial confinement fusion (ICF) in the fuel pellet which acts as a highly concentrated point source of neutrons which in turn converts and fissions the outer fissionable blanket. In parallel with the ICF approach, the University of Texas at Austin is developing a system based on the tokamak fusion reactor, optimising for nuclear waste disposal versus power generation. The principles behind using either ICF or tokamak reactors as a neutron source are essentially the same (the primary difference being that ICF is essentially a point-source of neutrons while Tokamaks are more diffuse toroidal sources).

== Use to dispose of nuclear waste ==
The surrounding blanket can be a fissile material (enriched uranium or plutonium) or a fertile material (capable of conversion into a fissionable material by neutron bombardment) such as thorium, depleted uranium, or spent nuclear fuel. Such subcritical reactors (which also include particle accelerator-driven neutron spallation systems) offer the only currently-known means of active disposal (versus storage) of spent nuclear fuel without reprocessing. Fission by-products produced by the operation of commercial light-water nuclear reactors (LWRs) are long-lived and highly radioactive, but they can be consumed using the excess neutrons in the fusion reaction along with the fissionable components in the blanket, essentially destroying them by nuclear transmutation and producing a waste product which is far safer and less of a risk for nuclear proliferation. The waste would contain significantly reduced concentrations of long-lived, weapons-usable actinides per gigawatt-year of electric energy produced compared to the waste from a LWR. In addition, there would be about 20 times less waste per unit of electricity produced. This offers the potential to efficiently use the very large stockpiles of enriched fissile materials, depleted uranium, and spent nuclear fuel.

== Safety ==
In contrast to current commercial fission reactors, hybrid reactors potentially demonstrate what is considered inherently safe behavior because they remain deeply subcritical under all conditions and decay heat removal is possible via passive mechanisms. The fission is driven by neutrons provided by fusion ignition events, and is consequently not self-sustaining. If the fusion process is deliberately shut off or the process is disrupted by a mechanical failure, the fission damps out and stops nearly instantly. This is in contrast to the forced damping in a conventional reactor by means of control rods which absorb neutrons to reduce the neutron flux below the critical, self-sustaining, level. The inherent danger of a conventional fission reactor is any situation leading to a positive feedback and a runaway chain reaction such as occurred during the Chernobyl disaster. In a hybrid configuration the fission and fusion reactions are decoupled, i.e. while the fusion neutron output drives the fission, the fission output has no effect whatsoever on the fusion reaction, eliminating any chance of a positive feedback loop.

== Fuel cycle ==
There are three main components to the hybrid fusion fuel cycle: deuterium, tritium, and fissionable elements. Deuterium can be derived by the separation of hydrogen isotopes in seawater (see Heavy water production). Tritium may be generated in the hybrid process itself by absorption of neutrons in lithium bearing compounds. This would entail an additional lithium-bearing blanket and a means of collection. Small amounts of tritium are also produced by neutron activation in nuclear fission reactors, particularly when heavy water is used as a neutron moderator or coolant. The third component is externally derived fissionable materials from demilitarized supplies of fissionables, or commercial nuclear fuel and waste streams. Fusion driven fission also offers the possibility of using thorium as a fuel, which would greatly increase the potential amount of fissionables available. The extremely energetic nature of the fast neutrons emitted during the fusion events (up to 0.17 the speed of light) can allow normally non-fissioning ^{238}U to undergo fission directly (without conversion first to ^{239}Pu), enabling refined natural uranium to be used with very low enrichment, while still maintaining a deeply subcritical regime.

== Engineering considerations ==
Practical engineering designs must first take into account safety as the primary goal. All designs should incorporate passive cooling in combination with refractory materials to prevent melting and reconfiguration of fissionables into geometries capable of un-intentional criticality. Blanket layers of Lithium bearing compounds will generally be included as part of the design to generate tritium to allow the system to be self-supporting for one of the key fuel element components. Tritium, because of its relatively short half-life and extremely high radioactivity, is best generated on-site to obviate the necessity of transportation from a remote location. D-T fuel can be manufactured on-site using Deuterium derived from heavy water production and tritium generated in the hybrid reactor itself. Nuclear spallation to generate additional neutrons can be used to enhance the fission output, with the caveat that this is a tradeoff between the number of neutrons (typically 20-30 neutrons per spallation event) against a reduction of the individual energy of each neutron. This is a consideration if the reactor is to use natural Thorium as a fuel. While high-energy (0.17c) neutrons produced from fusion events are capable of directly causing fission in both Thorium and ^{238}U, the lower energy neutrons produced by spallation generally cannot. This is a tradeoff that affects the mixture of fuels against the degree of spallation used in the design.

== See also ==
- Aneutronic fusion a category of nuclear reactions in which only a small part (or none) of the energy released is carried away by energetic neutrons.
- Breeder reactor, a nuclear reactor that generates more fissile material in fuel than it consumes.
- Cold fusion
- COLEX process (isotopic separation)
- Generation IV reactor, next generation fission reactor designs claiming much higher safety, and greatly increased fuel use efficiency.
- Integral Fast Reactor, a fission fast breeder reactor which uses reprocessing via electrorefining at the reactor site, capable of consuming wastes from LWRs and using depleted uranium as a fuel.
- Liquid fluoride thorium reactor, a fission reactor which uses molten thorium fluoride salt fuel, capable of consuming wastes from LWRs.
- Muon-catalyzed fusion, which uses exotic particles to achieve fusion ignition at relatively low temperatures.
- Project PACER, a reverse of this concept, attempts to use small fission explosions to ignite hydrogen fusion (fusion bombs) for power generation
- Subcritical reactor, a broad category of designs using various external neutron sources including spallation to generate non-self-sustaining fission (hybrid fusion–fission reactors fall into this category).
- Traveling wave reactor, a pure fission reactor with a moving reaction zone, which can also consume wastes from LWRs and use depleted uranium as a fuel.
- Boosted fission weapon, a variety of nuclear weapon that uses neutrons from nuclear fusion to increase the efficiency of a fission reaction.
- Thermonuclear weapon, a nuclear weapon that uses a combination of fission and fusion; some designs use fusion neutrons to ignite an additional fission stage.
