= Spallation Neutron Source =

Accelerator-based neutron source in Oak Ridge, Tennessee, US

Coordinates: 35.951°N 84.302°W

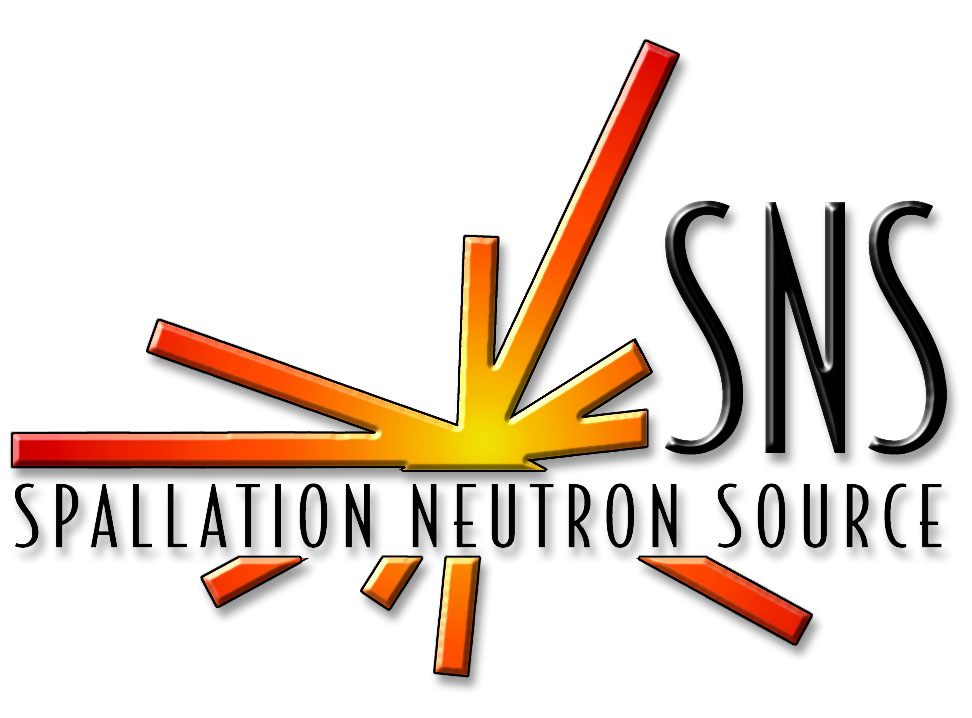

A DOE Office of Science User Facility
- Location: Oak Ridge National Laboratory, Oak Ridge, Tennessee, United States
- Scientific Purpose: Provide unique information about the structure and properties of materials across the spectrum of biology, chemistry, physics, and engineering.
- Organization: SNS is part of the ORNL Neutron Sciences Directorate, which also includes the High Flux Isotope Reactor, a steady-state neutron source.
- Web site: neutrons.ornl.gov

The Spallation Neutron Source (SNS) is an accelerator-based neutron source facility in the U.S. that provides the most intense pulsed neutron beams in the world for scientific research and industrial development. Each year, the facility hosts hundreds of researchers from universities, national laboratories, and industry, who conduct basic and applied research and technology development using neutrons. SNS is part of Oak Ridge National Laboratory, which is managed by UT-Battelle for the United States Department of Energy (DOE). SNS is a DOE Office of Science user facility, and it is open to scientists and researchers from all over the world.

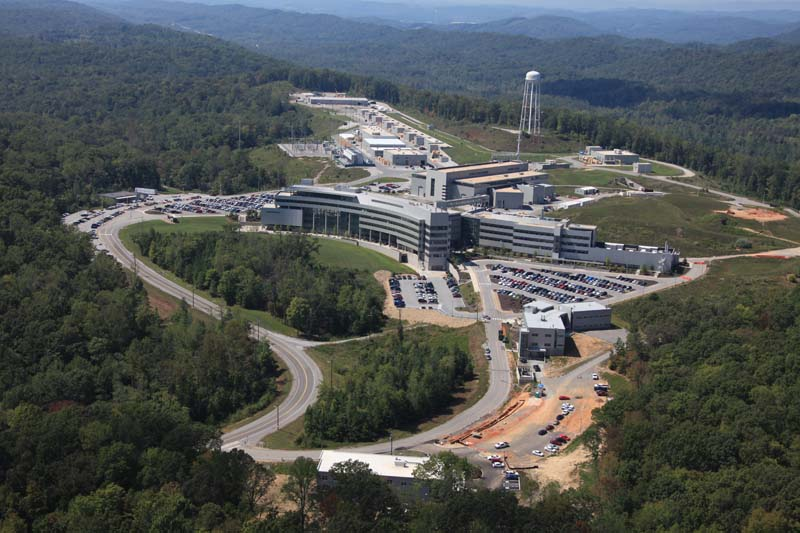
Aerial view of the Spallation Neutron Source building

== History ==
Most of the world's neutron sources were built decades ago, and although the uses and demand for neutrons have increased throughout the years, few new sources have been built. To fill that need for a new, improved neutron source, the DOE Office of Basic Energy Sciences funded the construction of SNS, which would provide the most intense pulsed neutron beams in the world for scientific research and industrial development.

The construction of SNS was a partnership of six DOE national laboratories: Argonne, Brookhaven, Lawrence Berkeley, Los Alamos, Oak Ridge, and Jefferson. This collaboration was one of the largest of its kind in U.S. scientific history and was used to bring together the best minds and experience from many different fields.

After more than five years of construction and a cost of $1.4 billion, SNS was completed in April 2006. The first three instruments began commissioning and were available to the scientific community in August 2007. As of 2017, 20 instruments have been completed, and SNS is hosting about 1,400 researchers per year.

== Neutron scattering research ==
Neutron scattering allows scientists to count scattered neutrons, measure their energies and the angles at which they scatter, and map their final positions. This information can reveal the molecular and magnetic structure and behavior of materials, such as high-temperature superconductors, polymers, metals, and biological samples. In addition to studies focused on fundamental physics, neutron scattering research has applications in structural biology and biotechnology, magnetism and superconductivity, chemical and engineering materials, nanotechnology, complex fluids, and others.

== Spallation process ==
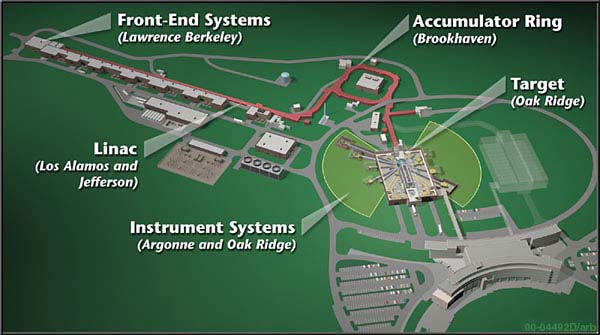
Three-dimensional rendering of the Spallation Neutron Source facility layout indicating the national laboratory responsible for each primary part of the facility. The areas in red are constructed underground.

The spallation process at SNS begins with negatively charged hydrogen ions that are produced by an ion source. Each ion consists of a proton orbited by two electrons. The ions are injected into a linear particle accelerator which accelerates them to an energy of about one GeV (or to about 90% the speed of light).

The ions pass through a foil which strips off each ion's two electrons, converting it to a proton. The protons pass into a ring-shaped structure, a proton accumulator ring, where they spin around at very high speeds and accumulate in "bunches." Each bunch of protons is released from the ring as a pulse, at a rate of 60 times per second (60 hertz). The high-energy proton pulses strike a target of liquid mercury, where spallation occurs. The spalled neutrons are then slowed in a moderator and guided through beam lines to areas containing special instruments where they are used in a wide variety of experiments.

== See also ==
- Materials science
- Neutron detection
- Neutron electric dipole moment
- Neutron facilities
- Neutron scattering
- NPDGamma experiment
- Coherent Collaboration
- Subcritical reactor
- Nuclear transmutation
