= TeraView =

Coordinates: 52.2342°N 0.1518°E

TeraView Ltd
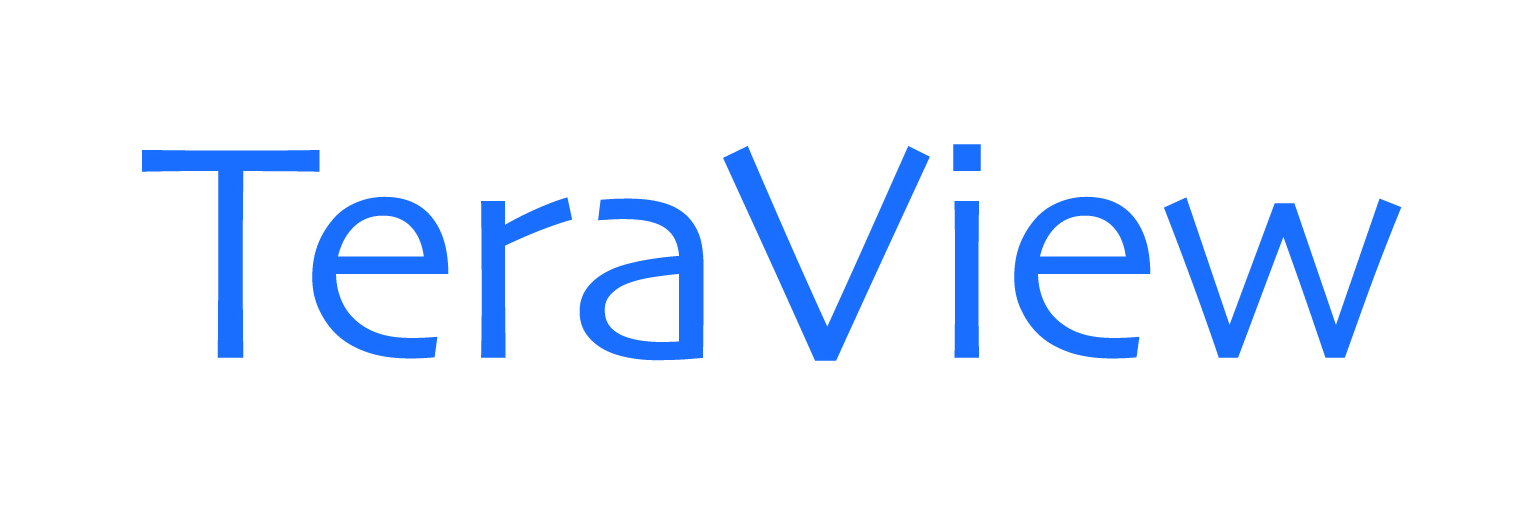
- Industry: Semiconductors
- Founded: 2001 (from Toshiba Research Europe)
- Founder: Michael Pepper, Don Arnone (from Toshiba Research Europe)
- Headquarters: 1 Enterprise, Cambridge Research Park, Cambridge, United Kingdom
- Area served: Worldwide
- Key people: Don Arnone (CEO); Sir Michael Pepper (Chief Scientific Director)
- Products: Terahertz imaging and spectroscopy equipment
- Number of employees: 30+ (2024)
- Website: TeraView

TeraView Limited, or TeraView, is a company that designs terahertz imaging and spectroscopy instruments and equipment for measurement and evaluation of pharmaceutical tablets, nanomaterials, ceramics and composites, integrated circuit chips and more.

TeraView was co-founded by Michael Pepper (CSO) and Dr Don Arnone (CEO) as a spin-out of Toshiba Research Europe in April 2001. The company was set up to exploit the intellectual property and expertise developed in sourcing and detecting terahertz radiation (1 THz= 33.3 cm^{−1}), using semiconductor technologies. Leading industry proponents of the technology sit on its Advisory Board, and TeraView maintains close links with the Cavendish Laboratory at the University of Cambridge, which was one of the research universities which had an interest in Terahertz techniques. It is also where Professor Pepper, has held the position of Professor of Physics since 1987.

== Products ==
TeraView has developed a number of instruments that harness the properties of terahertz radiation. Terahertz light has some interesting application. Many common materials and living tissues are semi-transparent and have 'terahertz fingerprints', permitting them to be imaged, identified, and analyzed. Moreover, the non-ionizing properties of terahertz radiation and the relatively low power levels used indicate that it is safe.

- TeraPulse 4000 - spectrometer with modular sample compartment for transmission, attenuated total reflection analysis, cryostats, variable temperature cells and reflection modules for imaging. Spectral range – 0.06 THz to 5.0 THz (2 cm^{−1} – 150 cm^{−1}) with a dynamic range of greater than 90 dB at peak.
- EOTPR 3000 - Electro-optical terahertz pulsed reflectometer - spectrometer for identification and isolation of faults on interconnects of advanced packages, such as flip chip, package on package (PoP) and potentially through-silicon vias.

By applying different software analysis packages, the same base technologies can be brought to bear to several applications.

== Research and development areas ==
The company's primary focus of investigation includes the development of terahertz light into a useful spectroscopic and imaging technique. The 'terahertz gap' – where until recently bright sources of light and sensitive means of detection were difficult to access – encompasses frequencies invisible to the naked eye in the electromagnetic spectrum, lying between microwave and infrared in the range from 0.3 to 3THz. TeraView's existing instruments generate, detect and manipulate THz light and have been tested in a number of application areas.

=== Pharmaceutical industry ===
The applications of terahertz radiation in the pharmaceutical industry include nondestructive estimation of critical quality attributes in pharmaceutical products such as crystalline structure, thickness and chemical composition analysis. TeraView has demonstrated that terahertz instruments can produce 3D coating thickness maps for multiple coating layers and structural features models allowing better understanding and control of product scale up and manufacture.

=== Medical imaging ===
Due in part to its ability to recognize spectral fingerprints, terahertz pulsed imaging can be applied to provide contrast between different types of soft tissue. Also, it is a sensitive means of detecting the degree of water content and markers of cancer and other diseases. Attempts have been made to apply Terahertz to image cancers like breast, cancer as well as other diseases in medicine, oral health care, and related areas. The company announced it has been cleared by the Medicines and Healthcare products Regulatory Agency (MHRA) to trial in-vivo terahertz spectroscopy for bio-medical research. The trials will be held in Guy's Hospital in London and aim to determine if the technology can be applied real-time for accurate removal of cancer tissue.

=== Homeland security and defense ===
Terahertz technology has the potential to safely, noninvasively and quickly image through different types of clothing and other concealment and confusion materials. It has been hypothesized that because THz light is absorbed by explosive materials at certain frequencies it may be possible to find unique 'terahertz fingerprints' that can be distinguished from clothing or other materials. This has never been proved in a practical sense. The company's technology has been used by the Naval Surface Warfare Command to test the presence of different types of plastic explosives through clothing, including PETN (Pentaerythritol tetranitrate).

=== Material characterization ===
THz spectroscopy can be used as a non-contact analytical method. The absorption coefficient and refractive index measured by terahertz pulsed spectroscopy can be used directly to obtain the high frequency-dependent complex conductivities of materials in the 0.1 – 3 THz (3 – 100 cm^{−1}) region of the electromagnetic spectrum. The technology has been applied to some areas of solid state physics research such as semiconductors, high-temperature superconductors, terahertz metamaterials, carrier density dynamics, graphene, carbon nanotubes, magnetism and more.

=== Nondestructive testing ===
Terahertz light can be used as non-contact technique for analysis in material integrity studies. It has proved to be effective in nondestructive inspection of layers in paints and coatings, detecting structural defects in ceramic and composite materials and imaging the physical structure of paintings and manuscripts. The use of THz waves for non-destructive evaluation enables inspection of multi-layered structures and can identify abnormalities from foreign material inclusions, disbond and delamination, mechanical impact damage, heat damage, and water or hydraulic fluid ingression. The company's Chief Scientific Director, Sir Michael Pepper, explains that THz imaging can measure thickness across a substrate precisely and it can also obtain the density of the coating: "The radiation is reflected each time there is a change in material. The time of arrival is measured and then various algorithms complete the picture by developing 3D fine feature images and precise material identifications". Further research by the company and active collaboration with the University of Cambridge is aiming to develop a terahertz sensor that can be used to measure the quality of paint coatings on cars.

=== Semiconductor industry ===
Terahertz technology allows high resolution 3D imaging of semiconductor packages and integrated circuit devices. THz time-domain reflectometry (TDR) offers significant advantages in imaging resolution compared to existing fault isolation techniques and conventional millimetre wave systems. Working with Intel on the applications of THz technology for the semiconductor industry, TeraView developed a new technique which combines electro-optics and THz pulses in a non-destructive Electro Optical Terahertz Pulse Reflectometry (EOTPR) which operates at up to 2 THz with resolution of 10 μm for improved fault isolation and failure analysis process-flow studies. "The unique capabilities of terahertz TDR and its advantages over the conventional TDR have been recognized. With such revolutionary concept, innovative design and superior performance, EOTPR will become an essential tool for microelectronic package fault isolation and failure analysis." Yongming Cai, Zhiyong Wang, Rajen Dias, and Deepak Goyal, Intel Corporation.

== See also ==
- Terahertz radiation
- Terahertz time-domain spectroscopy
- Terahertz metamaterials
- Terahertz nondestructive evaluation
- Terahertz tomography
- Michael Pepper
