= Far-infrared laser =

Far-infrared laser or terahertz laser (FIR laser, THz laser) is a laser with output wavelength in between 30 and 1000 μm (frequency 0.3-10 THz), in the far infrared or terahertz frequency band of the electromagnetic spectrum.

FIR lasers have application in terahertz spectroscopy, terahertz imaging as well in fusion plasma physics diagnostics. They can be used to detect explosives and chemical warfare agents, by the means of infrared spectroscopy or to evaluate the plasma densities by the means of interferometry techniques.

FIR lasers typically consist of a long (1–3 meters) waveguide filled with gaseous organic molecules, optically pumped or via HV discharge. They are highly inefficient, often require helium cooling, high magnetic fields, and/or are only line tunable. Efforts to develop smaller solid-state alternatives are under way.

The p-Ge (p-type germanium) laser is a tunable, solid state, far infrared laser which has existed for over 25 years. It operates in crossed electric and magnetic fields at liquid helium temperatures. Wavelength selection can be achieved by changing the applied electric/magnetic fields or through the introduction of intracavity elements.

Quantum cascade laser (QCL) is a construction of such alternative. It is a solid-state semiconductor laser that can operate continuously with output power of over 100 mW and wavelength of 9.5 μm. A prototype was already demonstrated. and potential use shown.

A molecular FIR laser optically pumped by a QCL has been demonstrated in 2016. It operates at room-temperature and is smaller than molecular FIR lasers optically pumped by CO_{2} lasers.

Free electron lasers can also operate on far infrared wavelengths.

Femtosecond Ti:sapphire mode-locked lasers are also being used to generate very short pulses that can be optically rectified to produce a terahertz pulse.

== See also ==
- Laser
- Xaser
- Infrared laser
- Terahertz radiation
