= Terahertz tomography =

- Purpose: Imaging is done by terahertz radiation

Terahertz tomography is a class of tomography where sectional imaging is done by terahertz radiation. Terahertz radiation is electromagnetic radiation with a frequency between 0.1 and 10 THz; it falls between radio waves and light waves on the spectrum; it encompasses portions of the millimeter waves and infrared wavelengths. Because of its high frequency and short wavelength, terahertz wave has a high signal-to-noise ratio in the time domain spectrum. Tomography using terahertz radiation can image samples that are opaque in the visible and near-infrared regions of the spectrum. Terahertz wave three-dimensional (3D) imaging technology has developed rapidly since its first successful application in 1997, and a series of new 3D imaging technologies have been proposed successively.

== Terahertz imaging ==
Terahertz imaging has advantages over the more expensive and shorter range X-ray scanners. A variety of materials are transparent to terahertz radiation, which allows it to measure the thickness, density, and structural properties of materials that are difficult to detect. Since terahertz is not ionizing radiation, the use of terahertz does not cause damage to living tissue, making terahertz a safe, non-invasive biomedical imaging technique. Moreover, because many materials have a unique spectral signature in the terahertz range, terahertz radiation can be used to identify materials. Terahertz imaging is widely used in the study of semiconductor material properties, biomedical cell imaging, and chemical and biological examination. Terahertz time domain systems (THz-tds) have made significant advances in 2D imaging. THz-tds is able to determine the sample complex dielectric constant, usually 0.1–4 THz, and provides information about the static characteristics of the sample over dozens of frequencies. However, this technology has some limitations. For example, due to the lower power of the beam, the sensor must be more sensitive. Low image acquisition speeds may force a tradeoff between time and resolution.

=== Applications ===
Terahertz imaging can be useful for luggage and postal mail screening because it can identify substances on the basis of their characteristic spectra in this frequency band, such as explosives and illicit drugs; for example, several liquid explosives can be distinguished by the change in dielectric response in the terahertz range as a function of alcohol percentage. Although dangerous metal objects, such as knives, can be recognized by their shapes through certain pattern recognition algorithms, it is impossible to see through metallic packages with terahertz waves. Thus, terahertz spectrometers cannot replace X-ray scanners, even though they provide more information than X-ray scanners for low-density materials and chemical separation.

Terahertz systems are used for production control in the paper and polymer industries. They can detect thickness and moisture content in paper and conductive properties, moisture level, fiber orientation and glass-transition temperature in polymers.

Terahertz systems facilitate the detection of metallic and nonmetallic contamination in food. For example, terahertz waves made it possible to detect metallic and nonmetallic foreign matter in chocolate bars, since food with low water contents, such as chocolates, are almost transparent in the terahertz band. Terahertz tomography is also useful in the wine and spirits industries for quantifying moisture and analysing cork non-destructively.

Terahertz imaging can detect different isomers have different spectral fingerprints in the terahertz range, which enables terahertz spectroscopy to distinguish between stereoisomers—a crucial distinction in pharmacy, where one isomer may be the active compound and its enantiomer may be inactive or even dangerous. Terahertz systems are also used for gauging tablet coating quality.

Terahertz imaging enables non-destructive analysis of valuable artworks and can be conducted onsite. It can reveal hidden layers and via the transmittance of various pigments. It is also being investigated as a tool for 3D visualization.

==== Skin Cancer Imaging ====
Terahertz tomography typically relies on pulsed THz time-domain, where short bursts of terahertz radiation are emitted and detected to capture both the amplitude and phase of the transmitted or reflected signal. As the sample rotates (in transmission geometry) or the beam is scanned across the surface (in reflection geometry), a sinogram is built, encoding spatial and spectral information essential for tomographic reconstruction.

In the case of skin cancer imaging, the use of reflection geometry allows for the encoding of skin cancer lesions over the range of the image obtaining multiple data points. Experimental acquisition of skin cancer data often employs quantum cascade lasers (QCLs) and laser feedback interferometry, where the laser functions as both the source and the detector. This approach offers high sensitivity, coherent detection, self-alignment, and high frame rates, while also mitigating the limitations associated with traditional detectors.

Once the sinogram is acquired, the data is reconstructed into volumetric images. For weakly absorbing samples, conventional filtered back-projection (FBP) suffices. However, for strongly scattering tissues or limited-view problems, more advanced methods are employed:

- Algebraic reconstruction techniques (ART) or iterative solvers with regularization
- Compressed sensing approaches exploiting signal sparsity
- Deep learning-based inverters, which are increasingly used to accelerate and stabilize reconstructions, especially under noisy or undersampled conditions

A key advantage of this instrumentation is that each pixel is sampled multiple times by varying the position of the sample and/or laser, enabling more accurate data acquisition while requiring less computational power.

Data collection becomes considerably simpler following building the system. There are two possibilities to collect data, the first one is single images, where every pixel is scanned once and built as a photograph. These allow for faster scan times but cannot account for motion blur or other variations. The second is multiple scans of the region (and averaging those. This accounts for motion blur however it takes longer to acquire, process, and have a result. The advantage of both methods is that this data becomes four dimensional, with two dimensions being the space, and the other two being the amplitude and phase of the reflected signal.

These methodological and technological advancements are critical for intraoperative imaging in oncology. The high contrast between cancerous and healthy tissue in the terahertz range enables more accurate detection of tumor margins—essential for clean excision, particularly in delicate anatomical regions such as the face, brain, or breast. By enabling real-time margin assessment, terahertz tomography reduces the likelihood of incomplete resections and reoperations, ultimately improving patient outcomes and conserving healthcare resources. Furthermore, terahertz tomography allows for consistent treatment analysis without the implied risk of constant imaging. Being an imaging technique utilizing non-ionizing radiation, oncologists can issue consistent imaging sessions without risk of radiative damage to the patients. THz tomography also reduces the need for repeated surgeries, therefore saving money, reducing recovery time, and significantly improving the patient experience.

Terahertz tomography is particularly successful at cancer detection because tissue water molecule content significantly impacts this modality's reconstructed image contrast because water molecules have strong absorption and refractive indices at varying frequencies within the THz radiation region. Because diseased tissues absorb more water in comparison to healthy patient tissue, the THz radiation response is much stronger and the generated image can clearly resolve cancerous tissue from healthy ones. Other factors that impact the image contrast of terahertz tomography include tissue structure, protein composition, and blood flow.

== Methods ==
Terahertz tomography can be divided into transmission and reflection mode. It acts as an extension of X-ray computed tomography (CT) to a different waveband. It mainly studies the establishment of process models such as refraction, reflection and diffraction when terahertz waves transmit samples, which has certain requirements for reconstruction algorithms. According to the different transmission delay of Terahertz wave reflected signal at different depths inside the sample, the depth information can be obtained by processing the reflected signal inside the sample to realize the tomography. Terahertz time-of-flight tomography (THz-TOF) and THz optical coherence tomography (Thz-OCT) are mainly used in implementation.

=== THz diffraction tomography ===
In diffraction tomography, the detection beam interacts with the target and uses the resulting scattered waves to build a 3D image of the sample. The diffraction effect and the diffraction slice theorem shine light on the surface of the scattered object and record the reflected signal to obtain the diffraction field distribution after the sample in order to explore the surface shape of the target object. For fine samples with more complex surface structure, diffraction tomography is effective because it can provide a sample refractive index distribution. However, there are also drawbacks: although the imaging speed of terahertz diffraction tomography is faster, its imaging quality is poor due to the lack of an effective reconstruction algorithm. In 2004, S. Waang et al. first used diffraction chromatography based on the THz-tds system to image polyethylene samples.

=== THz tomosynthesis ===
Tomosynthesis is a technique used to create high-image tomography. The reconstruction can be done by several projection angles, which creates the image faster. This technique has low resolution but faster imaging speed. This technique also has an advantage over terahertz CT. Terahertz CT is significantly affected by reflection and refraction, especially for wide and flat plate samples, which has a large incidence angle at the edge and severe signal attenuation. Therefore, it is difficult to obtain both complete projection data and substantial noise information simultaneously. However, terahertz fault synthetic tomography is not affected by refraction and reflection because of the small incidence angle during projection. It is an effective method for local imaging, rapid imaging, or incomplete sample rotation. In 2009, N. Unaguchi et al. in Japan used continuous terahertz solid-state frequency multiplier with frequency of 540 GHz to conduct TS imaging on three letters "T", "H" and "Z" at different depths of post-it notes. The back projection method and wiener filter were used to reconstruct the spatial distribution of three letters.

=== THz time of flight tomography ===
Terahertz fault chromatography can reconstruct the 3D distribution of the refractive index by reflecting the terahertz pulse at different depths in the sample. The depth distribution information of the refractive index can be obtained by analyzing the time delay of the peak value of the reflected pulse. The longitudinal resolution of time-of-flight tomography depends on the pulse width of terahertz waves (usually in the tens of microns); therefore, the vertical resolution of flight time chromatography is very high. In 2009, J.Takayanagi et al. designed an experimental system that successfully used tomography on a semiconductor sample consisting of three sheets of superimposed paper and a thin two-micron thick layer of GaAs.

=== 3D holography ===
The THz beam can be incorporated into 3D holography if the differentiation of each multiple scattered terahertz waves of different scattering orders is enabled. With both intensity and phase distribution recorded, the interference pattern generated by object light and reference light encodes more information than a focused image. The holograms can provide a 3D visualization of the object of interest when reconstructed via Fourier optics. However, it remains a challenge to obtain high quality images with this technique due to scattering and diffraction effects required for measurement. The high order scattering measurement usually results in poor signal to noise ratio (SNR).

=== Fresnel lenses ===
Fresnel lenses serve as a replacement for traditional refractive lenses with the advantages of being small and lightweight. As their focal lengths depend on frequencies, samples can be imaged at various locations along the propagation path to the imaging plane, which can be applied to tomographic imaging.

=== Synthetic aperture processing (SA) ===
Synthetic aperture processing (SA) differs from traditional imaging systems when collecting data. In contrast to the point-to-point measurement scheme, SA uses a diverging or unfocused beam. The phase information collected by SA can be adopted for 3D reconstruction.

=== Terahertz computed tomography (CT) ===
Terahertz computed tomography records both amplitude and spectral phase information when compared to X-ray imaging. Terahertz CT can identify and compare different substances while non-destructively locating them.

=== Laser Feedback Interferometry ===
Laser feedback interferometry (LFI) is a technique in which a portion of the laser's emitted light is reflected back into the laser cavity after interacting with a target. This re-injected light interferes with the intracavity field, causing measurable changes in the laser's output intensity or frequency. By analyzing these variations, information about the target's displacement, surface profile, or optical properties can be extracted. In skin cancer imaging, LFI paired with quantum cascade lasers allows for precise, real-time detection due to its high sensitivity, inherent self-alignment, and ability to operate without the need for external detectors.

== See also ==
- Terahertz metamaterial
- Terahertz nondestructive evaluation
- Terahertz radiation
- Terahertz time-domain spectroscopy
- Tomography
