= Zinc telluride =

Chemical compound

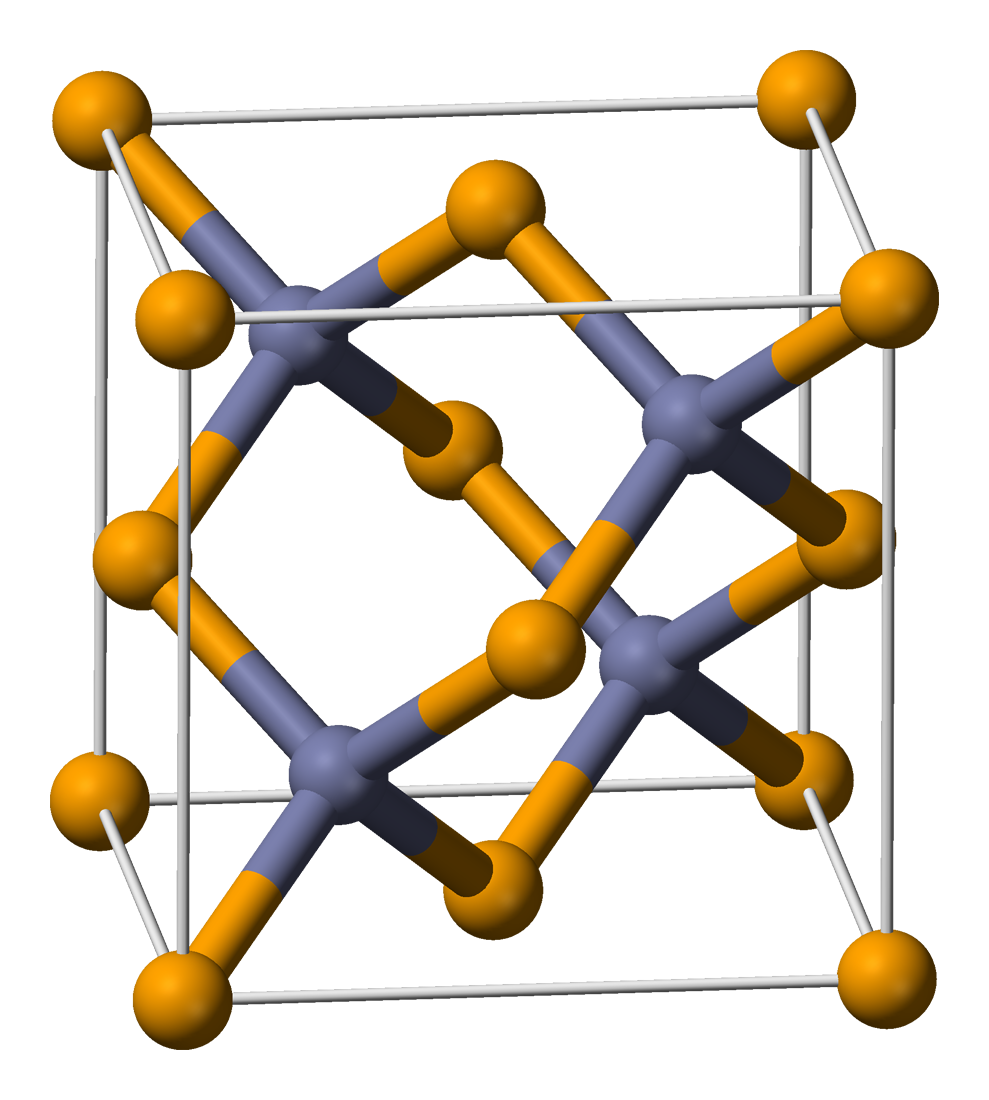
- The unit cell of a zinc telluride crystal.

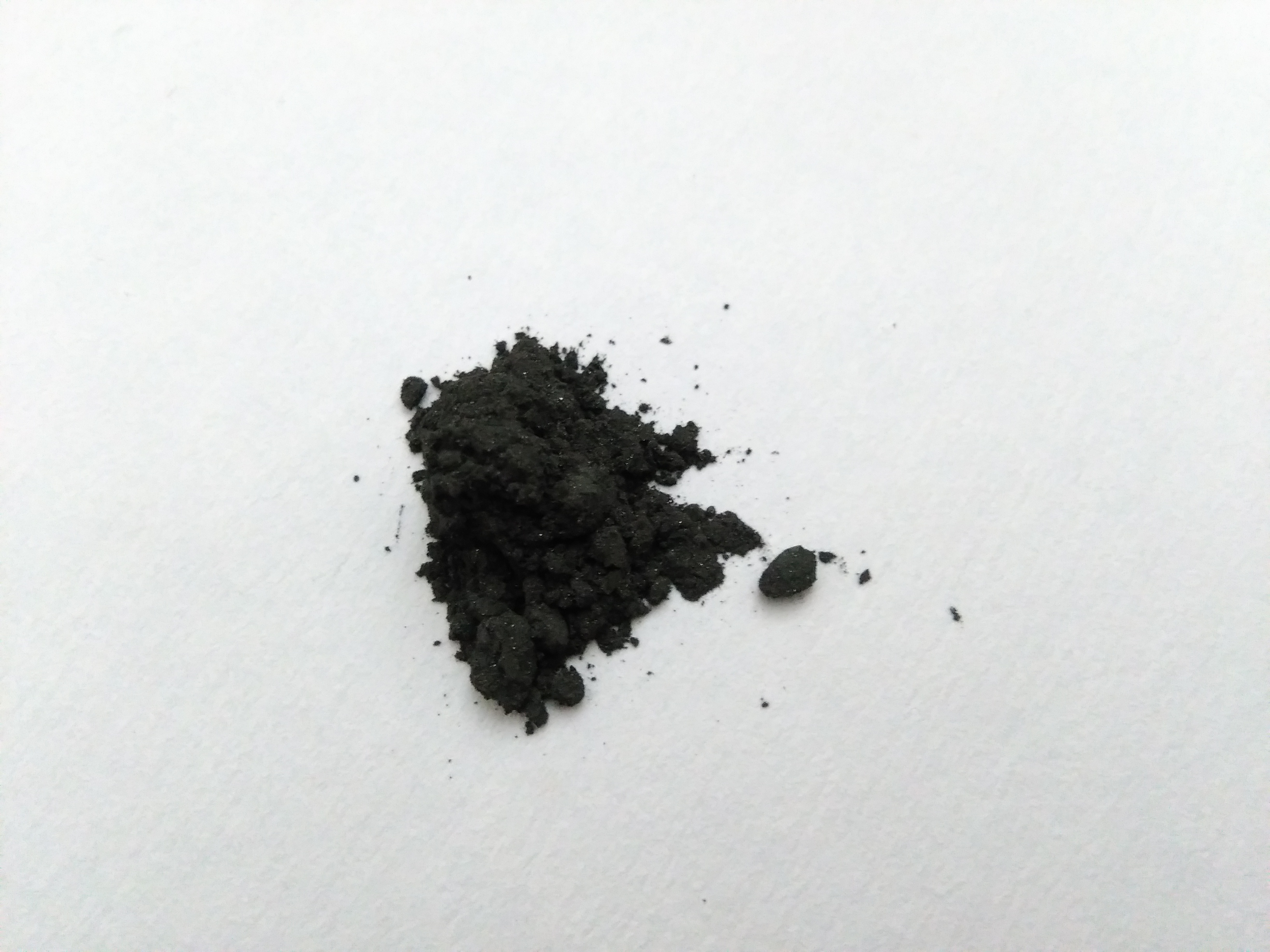

Identifiers
CAS Number	1315-11-3
3D model (JSmol)	Interactive image
ECHA InfoCard	100.013.874
EC Number	215-260-2
PubChem CID	3362486
UNII	IR8EB6G3VQ
CompTox Dashboard (EPA)	DTXSID0061664
- InChI: InChI=1S/Te.Zn Key: NSRBDSZKIKAZHT-UHFFFAOYSA-N
- SMILES: [Zn]=[Te]

Properties
Chemical formula	ZnTe
Molar mass	192.99 g/mol
Appearance	red crystals
Density	6.34 g/cm^{3}
Melting point	1,295 °C; 2,363 °F; 1,568 K
Band gap	2.26 eV
Electron mobility	340 cm^{2}/(V·s)
Thermal conductivity	108 mW/(cm·K)
Refractive index (n_{D})	3.56

Structure
Crystal structure	Zincblende (cubic)
Space group	F4̅3m
Lattice constant	a = 610.1 pm
Coordination geometry	Tetrahedral (Zn^{2+}); Tetrahedral (Te^{2−})

Thermochemistry
Heat capacity (C)	264 J/(kg·K)

Hazards
- GHS labelling
Pictograms	(GHS06: Toxic)
Signal word	Danger
Hazard statements	H330
Precautionary statements	P260, P271, P284, P304+P340, P316, P320, P403+P233, P405, P501

Related compounds
Other anions	Zinc oxide Zinc sulfide Zinc selenide
Other cations	Cadmium telluride Mercury telluride
Related compounds	Cadmium zinc telluride
- Except where otherwise noted, data are given for materials in their standard state (at 25 °C [77 °F], 100 kPa). verify (what is ?) Infobox references

Zinc telluride is a binary chemical compound with the formula ZnTe. This solid is a semiconductor material with a direct band gap of 2.26 eV. It is usually a p-type semiconductor. Its crystal structure is cubic, like that for sphalerite and diamond.

== Properties ==
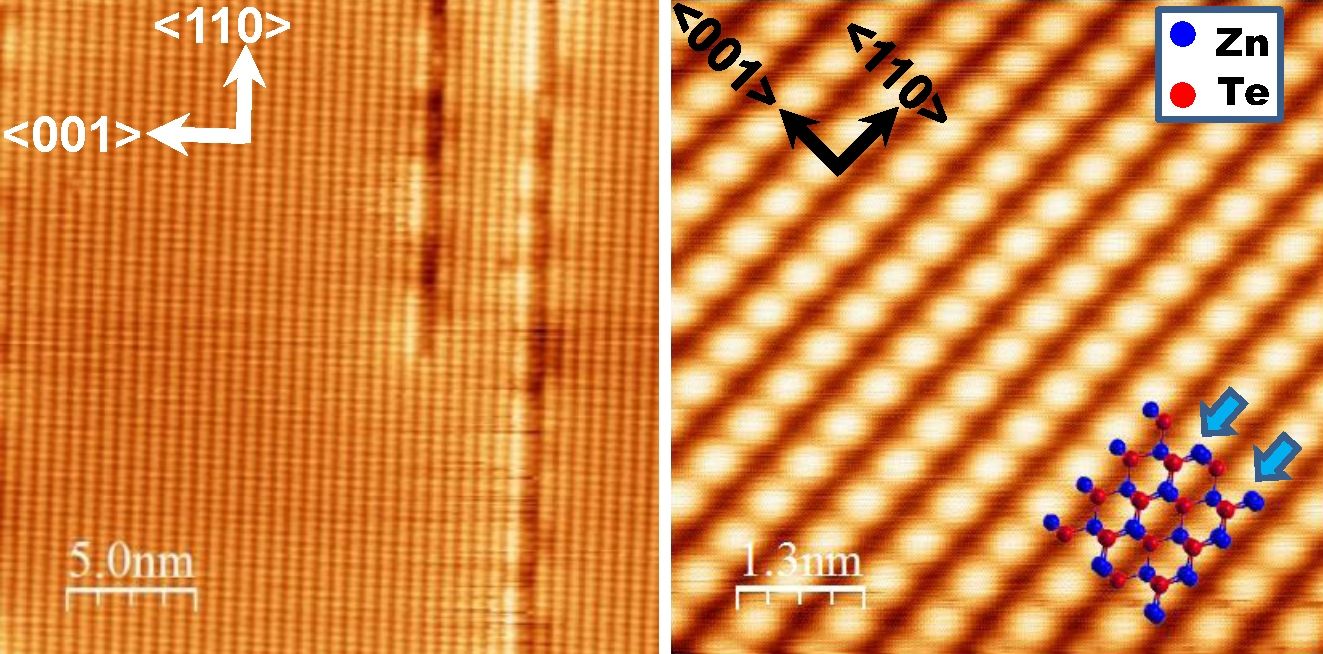
STM images of the ZnTe(110) surface, taken at different resolutions and sample rotation, together with its atomic model.

ZnTe has the appearance of grey or brownish-red powder, or ruby-red crystals when refined by sublimation. Zinc telluride typically has a cubic (sphalerite, or "zincblende") crystal structure, but can be also prepared as rocksalt crystals or in hexagonal crystals (wurtzite structure). Irradiated by a strong optical beam burns in presence of oxygen. Its lattice constant is 0.6101 nm, allowing it to be grown with or on aluminium antimonide, gallium antimonide, indium arsenide, and lead selenide. With some lattice mismatch, it can also be grown on other substrates such as GaAs, and it can be grown in thin-film polycrystalline (or nanocrystalline) form on substrates such as glass, for example, in the manufacture of thin-film solar cells. In the wurtzite (hexagonal) crystal structure, it has lattice parameters a = 0.427 and c = 0.699 nm.

== Applications ==
=== Optoelectronics ===
Zinc telluride can be easily doped, and for this reason it is one of the more common semiconducting materials used in optoelectronics. ZnTe is important for development of various semiconductor devices, including blue LEDs, laser diodes, solar cells, and components of microwave generators. It can be used for solar cells, for example, as a back-surface field layer and p-type semiconductor material for a CdTe/ZnTe structure or in PIN diode structures.

The material can also be used as a component of ternary semiconductor compounds, such as Cd_{x}Zn_{(1-x)}Te (conceptually a mixture composed from the end-members ZnTe and CdTe), which can be made with a varying composition x to allow the optical bandgap to be tuned as desired.

=== Nonlinear optics ===
Zinc telluride together with lithium niobate is often used for generation of pulsed terahertz radiation in time-domain terahertz spectroscopy and terahertz imaging. When a crystal of such material is subjected to a high-intensity light pulse of subpicosecond duration, it emits a pulse of terahertz frequency through a nonlinear optical process called optical rectification. Conversely, subjecting a zinc telluride crystal to terahertz radiation causes it to show optical birefringence and change the polarization of a transmitting light, making it an electro-optic detector.

Vanadium-doped zinc telluride, "ZnTe:V", is a non-linear optical photorefractive material of possible use in the protection of sensors at visible wavelengths. ZnTe:V optical limiters are light and compact, without complicated optics of conventional limiters. ZnTe:V can block a high-intensity jamming beam from a laser dazzler, while still passing the lower-intensity image of the observed scene. It can also be used in holographic interferometry, in reconfigurable optical interconnections, and in laser optical phase conjugation devices. It offers superior photorefractive performance at wavelengths between 600 and 1300 nm, in comparison with other III-V and II-VI compound semiconductors. By adding manganese as an additional dopant (ZnTe:V:Mn), its photorefractive yield can be significantly increased.
