= Picarin =

Plastic used to make optics

Picarin (Tsurupica) is a plastic used to make optics such as lenses for terahertz radiation.

== Optical properties ==
Picarin is useful for this purpose because it is highly transparent in both the THz and visible spectral ranges. The refractive index of Picarin is almost the same for THz (n=1.52) and visible light (n=1.52). It is very strong mechanically, and withstands optical polishing.

Unpolished picarin lenses offer the best performance at 2–7 THz spectral range. Unfortunately, unpolished surfaces scatter visible and near-IR light.
