= Protein dynamics =

Study of how proteins move and change shape

In molecular biology, proteins are generally thought to adopt unique structures determined by their amino acid sequences. However, proteins are not strictly static objects, but rather populate ensembles of (sometimes similar) conformations. Transitions between these states occur on a variety of length scales (tenths of angstroms to nm) and time scales (ns to s), and have been linked to functionally relevant phenomena such as allosteric signaling and enzyme catalysis.

The study of protein dynamics is most directly concerned with the transitions between these states, but can also involve the nature and equilibrium populations of the states themselves. These two perspectives—kinetics and thermodynamics, respectively—can be conceptually synthesized in an "energy landscape" paradigm: highly populated states and the kinetics of transitions between them can be described by the depths of energy wells and the heights of energy barriers, respectively.

Kinesin walking on a microtubule. It is a molecular biological machine that uses protein domain dynamics, visible by neutron spin echo spectroscopy

== Local flexibility: atoms and residues ==
Portions of protein structures often deviate from the equilibrium state. Some such excursions are harmonic, such as stochastic fluctuations of chemical bonds and bond angles. Others are anharmonic, such as sidechains that jump between separate discrete energy minima, or rotamers.

Evidence for local flexibility is often obtained from NMR spectroscopy. Flexible and potentially disordered regions of a protein can be detected using the random coil index. Flexibility in folded proteins can be identified by analyzing the spin relaxation of individual atoms in the protein. Flexibility can also be observed in very high-resolution electron density maps produced by X-ray crystallography, particularly when diffraction data is collected at room temperature instead of the traditional cryogenic temperature (typically near 100 K). Information on the frequency distribution and dynamics of local protein flexibility can be obtained using Raman and optical Kerr-effect spectroscopy as well as anisotropic microspectroscopy in the terahertz frequency domain. The internal re-arrangement of the amino acids during protein motion involves elastic and plastic deformations induced by viscoelastic forces, which can be probed with nano-rheology techniques.

== Regional flexibility: intra-domain multi-residue coupling ==
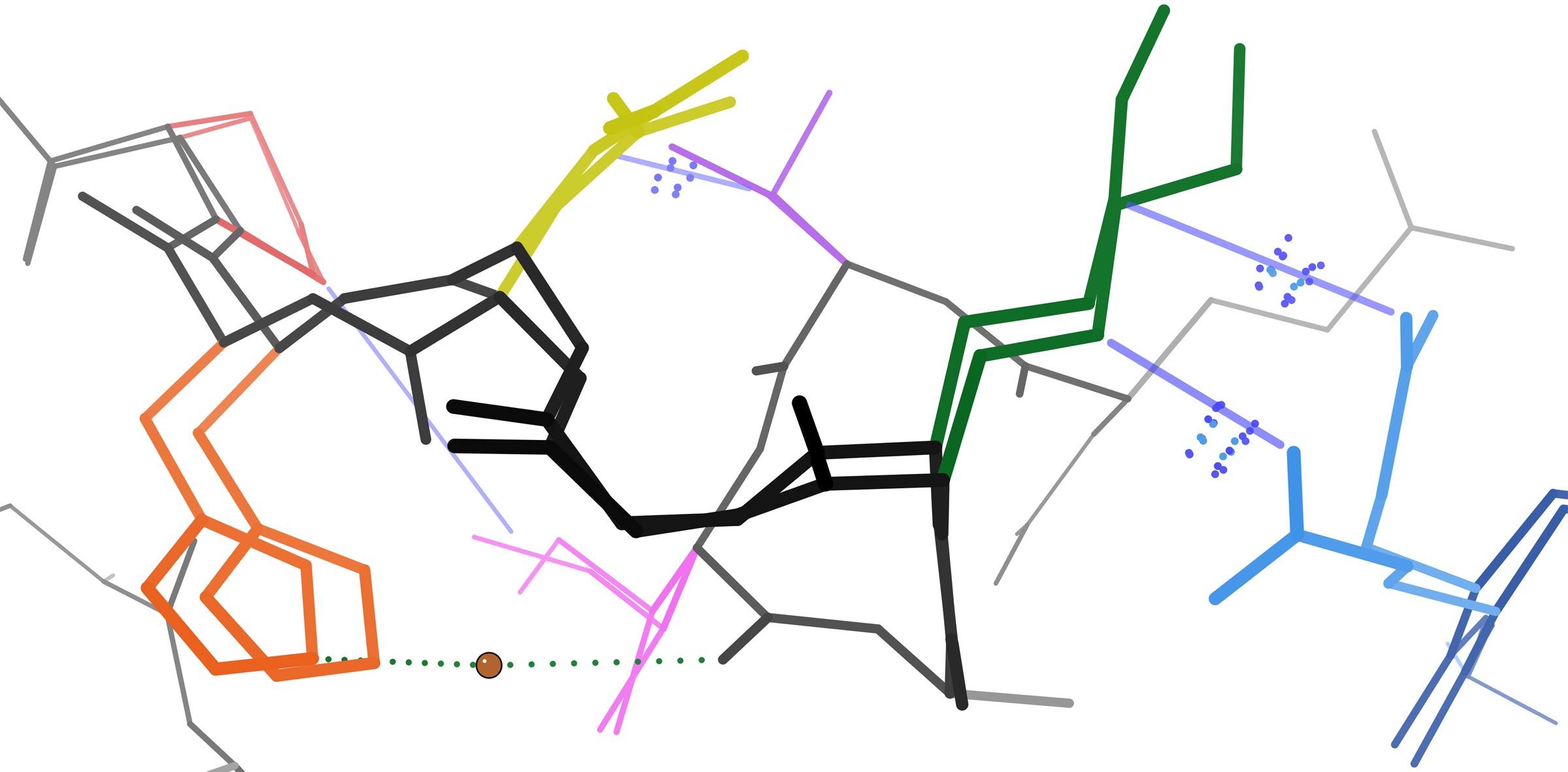
A network of alternative conformations in catalase (Protein Data Bank code: 1gwe) with diverse properties. Multiple phenomena define the network: van der Waals interactions (blue dots and line segments) between sidechains, a hydrogen bond (dotted green line) through a partial-occupancy water (brown), coupling through the locally mobile backbone (black), and perhaps electrostatic forces between the Lys (green) and nearby polar residues (blue: Glu, yellow: Asp, purple: Ser). This particular network is distal from the active site and is therefore putatively not critical for function.

Many residues are in close spatial proximity in protein structures. This is true for most residues that are contiguous in the primary sequence, but also for many that are distal in sequence yet are brought into contact in the final folded structure. Because of this proximity, these residues' energy landscapes become coupled based on various biophysical phenomena such as hydrogen bonds, ionic bonds, and van der Waals interactions (see figure).

Transitions between states for such sets of residues therefore become correlated.

This is perhaps most obvious for surface-exposed loops, which often shift collectively to adopt different conformations in different crystal structures. However, coupled conformational heterogeneity is also sometimes evident in secondary structure. For example, consecutive residues and residues offset by 4 in the primary sequence often interact in α helices. Also, residues offset by 2 in the primary sequence point their sidechains toward the same face of β sheets and are close enough to interact sterically, as are residues on adjacent strands of the same β sheet. Some of these conformational changes are induced by post-translational modifications in protein structure, such as phosphorylation and methylation.

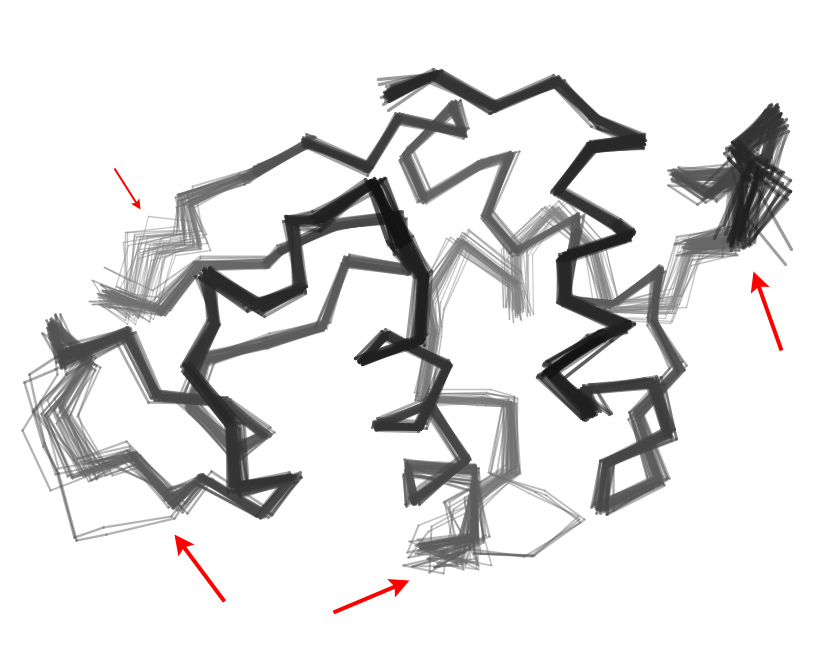
An "ensemble" of 44 crystal structures of hen egg white lysozyme from the Protein Data Bank, showing that different crystallization conditions lead to different conformations for various surface-exposed loops and termini (red arrows).

When these coupled residues form pathways linking functionally important parts of a protein, they may participate in allosteric signaling. For example, when a molecule of oxygen binds to one subunit of the hemoglobin tetramer, that information is allosterically propagated to the other three subunits, thereby enhancing their affinity for oxygen. In this case, the coupled flexibility in hemoglobin allows for cooperative oxygen binding, which is physiologically useful because it allows rapid oxygen loading in lung tissue and rapid oxygen unloading in oxygen-deprived tissues (e.g. muscle).

== Global flexibility: multiple domains ==
A ribosome is a biological machine that utilizes protein domain dynamics on nanoscopic scales

The presence of multiple domains in proteins gives rise to a great deal of flexibility and mobility, leading to protein domain dynamics. Domain motions can be directly observed using spectra measured by neutron spin echo spectroscopy. They can also be suggested by sampling in extensive molecular dynamics trajectories and principal component analysis or inferred by comparing different structures of a protein (as in Database of Molecular Motions).

Domain motions are important for:

- ABC transporters
- cellular locomotion and motor proteins
- enzyme catalysis
- formation of protein complexes
- ion channels
- mechanoreceptors and mechanotransduction
- regulatory activity
- transport of metabolites across cell membranes

One of the largest observed domain motions is the 'swivelling' mechanism in pyruvate phosphate dikinase. The phosphoinositide domain swivels between two states in order to bring a phosphate group from the active site of the nucleotide binding domain to that of the phosphoenolpyruvate/pyruvate domain. The phosphate group is moved over a distance of 45 Å involving a domain motion of about 100 degrees around a single residue. In enzymes, the closure of one domain onto another captures a substrate by an induced fit, allowing the reaction to take place in a controlled way. A detailed analysis by Gerstein led to the classification of two basic types of domain motion; hinge and shear. Only a relatively small portion of the chain, namely the inter-domain linker and side chains undergo significant conformational changes upon domain rearrangement.

=== Hinge motions ===
Hinge motion in disordered activation domain in Trypsinogen (PDB ID: 2PTN). The hinges predicted using PACKMAN. Hinge prediction are colored in blue (residues 23:28) and red (residues 175:182). The green colored region is the active site. Motion is generated using hdANM.

A study by Hayward found that the termini of α-helices and β-sheets form hinges in a large number of cases. Many hinges were found to involve two secondary structure elements acting like hinges of a door, allowing an opening and closing motion to occur. This can arise when two neighbouring strands within a β-sheet situated in one domain, diverge apart as they join the other domain. The two resulting termini then form the bending regions between the two domains. α-helices that preserve their hydrogen bonding network when bent are found to behave as mechanical hinges, storing `elastic energy' that drives the closure of domains for rapid capture of a substrate. Khade et al. worked on prediction of the hinges in any conformation and further built an Elastic Network Model called hdANM that can model those motions.

=== Helical to extended conformation ===
The interconversion of helical and extended conformations at the site of a domain boundary is not uncommon. In calmodulin, torsion angles change for five residues in the middle of a domain linking α-helix. The helix is split into two, almost perpendicular, smaller helices separated by four residues of an extended strand.

=== Shear motions ===
Shear motions involve a small sliding movement of domain interfaces, controlled by the amino acid side chains within the interface. Proteins displaying shear motions often have a layered architecture: stacking of secondary structures. The interdomain linker has merely the role of keeping the domains in close proximity.

=== Domain motion and functional dynamics in enzymes ===
The analysis of the internal dynamics of structurally different, but functionally similar enzymes has highlighted a common relationship between the positioning of the active site and the two principal protein sub-domains. In fact, for several members of the hydrolase superfamily, the catalytic site is located close to the interface separating the two principal quasi-rigid domains. Such positioning appears instrumental for maintaining the precise geometry of the active site, while allowing for an appreciable functionally oriented modulation of the flanking regions resulting from the relative motion of the two sub-domains.

=== Quantifying internal protein motions using strain ===
A natural measure to quantify and classify the subtle motions of amino acids that occur during conformational changes is the strain. When a group of amino acids moves together as a rigid body, the strain vanishes. In contrast, high strain values indicate that neighboring amino acids and atoms have moved with respect to each other. The effective strain is the relative change in distances between neighboring amino acids, which is a sensitive enough measure to probe the effects of single mutations on the structural landscape of protein.

== Implications for macromolecular evolution ==
Evidence suggests that protein dynamics are important for function, e.g. enzyme catalysis in dihydrofolate reductase (DHFR), yet they are also posited to facilitate the acquisition of new functions by molecular evolution. This argument suggests that proteins have evolved to have stable, mostly unique folded structures, but the unavoidable residual flexibility leads to some degree of functional promiscuity, which can be amplified/harnessed/diverted by subsequent mutations. Research on promiscuous proteins within the BCL-2 family revealed that nanosecond-scale protein dynamics can play a crucial role in protein binding behaviour and thus promiscuity.

However, there is growing awareness that intrinsically unstructured proteins are quite prevalent in eukaryotic genomes, casting further doubt on the simplest interpretation of Anfinsen's dogma: "sequence determines structure (singular)". In effect, the new paradigm is characterized by the addition of two caveats: "sequence and cellular environment determine structural ensemble".
