= Michael Pepper =

British scientist

Professor Sir Michael Pepper FRS FREng HonFInstP
- Born: 10 August 1942 (age 84)
- Education: University of Reading; Cambridge University
- Known for: One dimensional electron transport, Quantum Hall effect
- Awards: EPS Europhysics Prize (1985); Hughes Medal (1987); Mott Medal (2000); Royal Medal (2005); FREng (2009); IET Faraday Medal (2013); UNSW Dirac Medal (2013); IOP Newton Medal (2019)
- Scientific career
- Fields: Physics
- Workplaces: University College London; TeraView; University of Cambridge; Toshiba Research Europe Ltd; GEC Hirst Research Centre; Plessey
- Doctoral students: Andrew Dzurak; Alexander R. Hamilton
- Other notable students: Michelle Simmons

Sir Michael Pepper (born 10 August 1942) is a British physicist notable for his work in semiconductor nanostructures.

== Early life ==
Pepper was born on 10 August 1942 to Morris and Ruby Pepper (née Bloom), Morris was the son of Herschel (Harris) and Rebecca Pepper, who were both Ashkenazi Jewish immigrants living in the East End. He was educated at St Marylebone Grammar School, a grammar school in the City of Westminster, London that has since closed. He then went on to study physics at the University of Reading and graduated Bachelor of Science (BSc) in 1963. He remained at Reading to undertake postgraduate studies and completed his Doctor of Philosophy (PhD) degree in 1967.

In 1987, while an academic of the University of Cambridge, he was granted the status of Master of Arts (MA Cantab). He was awarded a higher doctorate, Doctor of Science (ScD), by Cambridge.

== Career ==
Sir Michael was a physicist at the Plessey Research Laboratories when he formed a collaboration with Sir Nevill Mott, (Nobel Laureate, 1977) which resulted in his commencing research in the Cavendish Laboratory in 1973 on localisation in semiconductor structures. He subsequently joined the GEC Hirst Research Centre where he set up joint Cambridge-GEC projects. He was one of three authors on the paper that eventually brought a Nobel prize for the quantum Hall effect to Klaus von Klitzing. Sir Michael formed the Semiconductor Physics research group at the Cavendish Laboratory in 1984, and following a period as Royal Society Warren Research Fellow was appointed to his current role, Professorship of Physics, at the Cavendish Laboratory in 1987. In 1991, he was appointed managing director of the newly established Toshiba Cambridge Research Centre, now known as the Cambridge Research Laboratory (CRL) of Toshiba Research Europe. The following year, 2001, he was appointed Scientific Director of TeraView, a company formed by spinning off the terahertz research arm of CRL. He became an honorary Professor of Pharmaceutical Science in the University of Otago, New Zealand in 2003. He left his Cambridge Chair to take up the Pender Chair of Nanoelectronics at University College London in 2009 and has been associated with many developments in Semiconductor Physics and applications of terahertz radiation. He sits on the Scientific Advisory Committee of Australia's ARC Centre of Excellence in Future Low-Energy Electronics Technologies.

== Honors ==
He was elected a Fellow of the Royal Society in 1983 and was elected a Fellow of Trinity College, Cambridge, in 1982. In 1987 he received the Hughes Medal. Previously he had received the Europhysics Prize of the European Physical Society, and the Guthrie Prize of the Institute of Physics both in 1985. The Institute of Physics awarded Sir Michael the first Mott Prize in 2000. He had previously given the first Mott Lecture in 1985. He was awarded the Royal Medal in 2005 for his "work which has had the highest level of influence in condensed matter physics and has resulted in the creation of the modern field of semiconductor nanostructures," gave the Royal Society's Bakerian Prize Lecture in 2004 and received a knighthood in the 2006 New Year's Honours list for services to physics. He was appointed a fellow of the Royal Academy of Engineering. In 2010 he won the Swan Medal and Prize. He has been awarded the 2013 Faraday Medal of the IET. In 2019 he was awarded the Institute of Physics Isaac Newton Medal.

== Research interests ==
- Current and resistance quantisation phenomena
- Measurement of electron charge
- One-dimensional and zero-dimensional electronic phenomena
- Quantum transport in general
- Localisation and metal-insulator transitions
- Properties of strongly interacting electron gases
- Bose–Einstein condensation in the solid state
- Hybrid magnetic-semiconductor structures
- Medical physics, Physics in medicine and biology

== Media appearances ==
- Horizon: What is One Degree (10 January 2011) – Interviewed by his former PhD student Ben Miller.

== See also ==
- Quantum Hall effect
