= Terahertz nondestructive evaluation =

Imaging and evaluation using the terahertz domain of electromagnetic radiation

Terahertz nondestructive evaluation pertains to devices, and techniques of analysis occurring in the terahertz domain of electromagnetic radiation. These devices and techniques evaluate the properties of a material, component or system without causing damage.

== Terahertz imaging ==
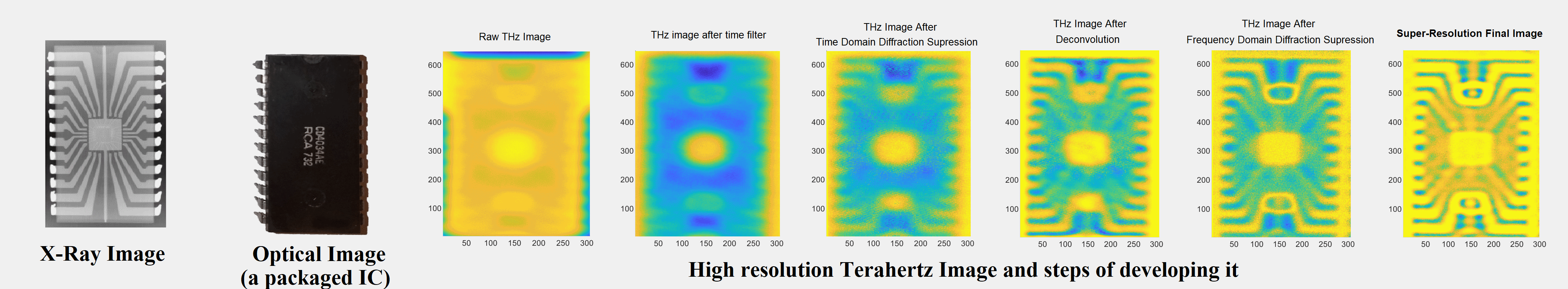
XRay, Optical, and THz image of a packaged IC.

Terahertz imaging is an emerging and significant nondestructive evaluation (NDE) technique used for dielectric (nonconducting, i.e., an insulator) materials analysis and quality control in the pharmaceutical, biomedical, security, materials characterization, and aerospace industries. It has proved to be effective in the inspection of layers in paints and coatings, detecting structural defects in ceramic and composite materials and imaging the physical structure of paintings and manuscripts. The use of THz waves for non-destructive evaluation enables inspection of multi-layered structures and can identify abnormalities from foreign material inclusions, disbond and delamination, mechanical impact damage, heat damage, and water or hydraulic fluid ingression. This new method can play a significant role in a number of industries for materials characterization applications where precision thickness mapping (to assure product dimensional tolerances within a product and from product-to-product) and density mapping (to assure product quality within a product and from product-to-product) are required.

== Nondestructive evaluation ==
Sensors and instruments are employed in the 0.1 to the 10 THz range for nondestructive evaluation, which includes detection.

=== Terahertz Density Thickness Imager ===
The Terahertz Density Thickness Imager is a nondestructive inspection method that employs terahertz energy for density and thickness mapping in dielectric, ceramic, and composite materials. This non-contact, single-sided terahertz electromagnetic measurement and imaging method characterizes micro-structure and thickness variation in dielectric (insulating) materials. This method was demonstrated for the Space Shuttle external tank sprayed-on foam insulation and has been designed for use as an inspection method for current and future NASA thermal protection systems and other dielectric material inspection applications where no contact can be made with the sample due to fragility and it is impractical to use ultrasonic methods.

=== Rotational spectroscopy ===
Rotational spectroscopy uses electromagnetic radiation in the frequency range from 0.1 to 4 terahertz (THz). This range includes millimeter-range wavelengths and is particularly sensitive to chemical molecules. The resulting THz absorption produces a unique and reproducible spectral pattern that identifies the material. THz spectroscopy can detect trace amounts of explosives in less than one second. Because explosives continually emit trace amounts of vapor, it should be possible to use these methods to detect concealed explosives from a distance.

=== THz-wave radar ===
THz-wave radar can sense gas leaks, chemicals and nuclear materials. In field tests, THz-wave radar detected chemicals at the 10-ppm level from 60 meters away. This method can be used in a fence line or aircraft mounted system that works day or night in any weather. It can locate and track chemical and radioactive plumes. THz-wave radar that can sense radioactive plumes from nuclear plants have detected plumes several kilometers away based on radiation-induced ionization effects in air.

=== THz tomography ===
THz tomography techniques are nondestructive methods that can use THz pulsed beam or millimeter-range sources to locate objects in 3D. These techniques include tomography, tomosynthesis, synthetic aperture radar and time of flight. Such techniques can resolve details on scales of less than one millimeter in objects that are several tens of centimeters in size.

=== Passive/active imaging techniques ===
Security imaging is currently being done by both active and passive methods. Active systems illuminate the subject with THz radiation whereas passive systems merely view the naturally occurring radiation from the subject.

Evidently passive systems are inherently safe, whereas an argument can be made that any form of "irradiation" of a person is undesirable. In technical and scientific terms, however, the active illumination schemes are safe according to all current legislation and standards.

The purpose of using active illumination sources is primarily to make the signal-to-noise ratio better. This is analogous to using a flash on a standard optical light camera when the ambient lighting level is too low.

For security imaging purposes the operating frequencies are typically in the range 0.1 THz to 0.8 THz (100 GHz to 800 GHz). In this range skin is not transparent so the imaging systems can look through clothing and hair, but not inside the body. There are privacy issues associated with such activities, especially surrounding the active systems since the active systems, with their higher quality images, can show very detailed anatomical features.

Active systems such as the L3 Provision and the Smiths eqo are actually mm-wave imaging systems rather than Terahertz imaging systems like Millitech systems. These widely deployed systems do not display images, avoiding any privacy issues. Instead they display generic "mannequin" outlines with any anomalous regions highlighted.

Since security screening is looking for anomalous images, items like false legs, false arms, colostomy bags, body-worn urinals, body-worn insulin pumps, and external breast augmentations will show up. Note that breast implants, being under the skin, will not be revealed.

Active imaging techniques can be used to perform medical imaging. Because THz radiation is biologically safe (non ionisant), it can be used in high resolution imaging to detect skin cancer.

== Space Shuttle inspections ==
NASA Space Shuttle inspections are an example of this technology's application.

After the Shuttle Columbia accident in 2003, Columbia Accident Investigation Board recommendation R3.2.1 stated "Initiate an aggressive program to eliminate all External Tank Thermal Protection System debris-shedding at the source…." To support this recommendation, inspection methods for flaws in foam are being evaluated, developed, and refined at NASA.

STS-114 employed Space Shuttle Discovery, and was the first "Return to Flight" Space Shuttle mission following the Space Shuttle Columbia disaster. It launched at 10:39 EDT, 26 July 2005. During the STS-114 flight significant foam shedding was observed. Therefore, the ability to nondestructively detect and characterize crushed foam after that flight became a significant priority when it was believed that the staff processing the tank had crushed foam by walking on it or from hail damage when the shuttle was on the launch pad or during other preparations for launch.

Additionally, density variations in the foam were also potential points of flaw initiation causing foam shedding. The innovation described below answered the call to develop a nondestructive, totally non-contact, non-liquid-coupled method that could simultaneously and precisely characterize thickness variation (from crushed foam due to worker handling and hail damage) and density variation in foam materials. It was critical to have a method that did not require fluid (water) coupling; i.e.; ultrasonic testing methods require water coupling.

There are millions of dollars of ultrasonic equipment in the field and on the market that are used as thickness gauges and density meters. When terahertz nondestructive evaluation is fully commercialized into a more portable form, and becomes less expensive it will be able to replace the ultrasonic instruments for structural plastic, ceramic, and foam materials. The new instruments will not require liquid coupling thereby enhancing their usefulness in field applications and possibly for high-temperature in-situ applications where liquid coupling is not possible. A potential new market segment can be developed with this technology.

== See also ==
- Destructive testing
- Inspection
- Maintenance testing
- Product certification
- Quality control
- Risk-based inspection
- Failure analysis
- Forensic engineering
- Materials science
- Predictive maintenance
- Reliability engineering
- Stress testing
- Terahertz radiation
- Terahertz metamaterials
