= Terahertz radiation =

Range 300-3000 GHz of the electromagnetic spectrum

Terahertz band
- Frequency range: 0.1 THz to 10 THz
- Wavelength range: 3 mm to 30 μm

Terahertz waves lie mostly at the far end of the infrared band; the longest terahertz waves lie in the microwave band.

Terahertz radiation – also known as terahertz waves, tremendously high frequency (THF), T-rays, T-waves, T-light, or T-lux– consists of electromagnetic waves within the frequency band from 0.1 to 10 terahertz (symbol THz), as designated by the International Telecommunication Union (ITU). (Note: Alternatively, it's designated from 0.3 to 3 THz in older texts. which is now called "decimillimetric waves") (Note: The upper boundary is somewhat arbitrary and has been considered by some sources to be 30 THz.) One terahertz is 10^{12} Hz or 1,000 GHz.

Wavelengths of terahertz radiation range from 3 millimeters and 30 micrometers (3 mm = 3000 μm to 30 μm), sometimes known as the submillimeter band, and its radiation as submillimeter waves, especially in astronomy. This band of electromagnetic radiation lies within the transition region between microwave and far infrared and can be regarded as either.

Compared to lower radio frequencies, terahertz radiation is strongly absorbed by the gases of the atmosphere, and in air, most of the energy is attenuated within a few meters, so it is not practical for long distance terrestrial radio communication. It can penetrate thin layers of materials but is blocked by thicker objects. THz beams transmitted through materials can be used for material characterization, layer inspection, relief measurement, and as a lower-energy alternative to X-rays for producing high resolution images of the interior of solid objects.

Terahertz radiation occupies a middle ground where the ranges of microwaves and infrared light waves overlap, known as the "terahertz gap"; it is called a "gap" because the technology for its generation and manipulation is still in its infancy. The generation and modulation of electromagnetic waves in this frequency range ceases to be possible by the conventional electronic devices used to generate radio waves and microwaves, requiring the development of new devices and techniques.

== Description ==
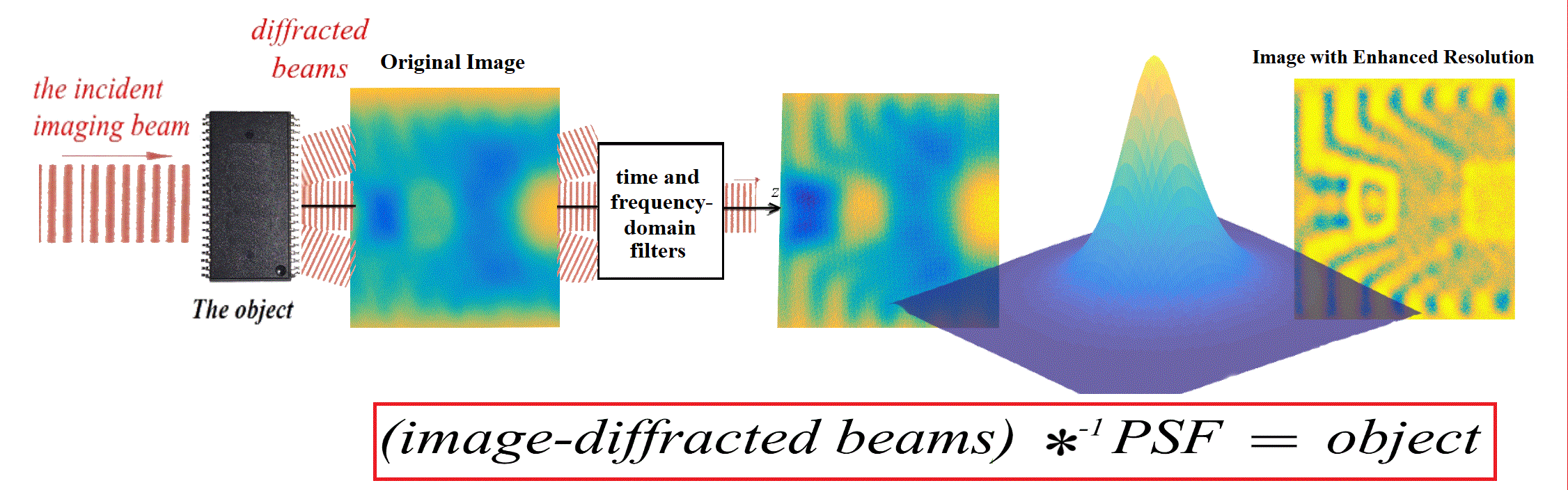
In THz-TDS systems, since the time-domain version of the THz signal is available, the distortion effects of the diffraction can be suppressed.

Terahertz radiation falls in between infrared radiation and microwave radiation in the electromagnetic spectrum, and it shares some properties with each of these. Terahertz radiation travels in a line of sight and is non-ionizing. Like microwaves, terahertz radiation can penetrate a wide variety of non-conducting materials; clothing, paper, cardboard, wood, masonry, plastic and ceramics. The penetration depth is typically less than that of microwave radiation. Like infrared, terahertz radiation has limited penetration through fog and clouds and cannot penetrate liquid water or metal. Terahertz radiation can penetrate some distance through body tissue like x-rays, but unlike them is non-ionizing, so it is of interest as a replacement for medical X-rays. Due to its longer wavelength, images made using terahertz waves have lower resolution than X-rays and need to be enhanced (see figure at right).

The earth's atmosphere is a strong absorber of terahertz radiation, so the range of terahertz radiation in air is limited to tens of meters, making it unsuitable for long-distance communications. However, at distances of ~10 meters the band may still allow many useful applications in imaging and construction of high bandwidth wireless networking systems, especially indoor systems. In addition, producing and detecting coherent terahertz radiation remains technically challenging, though inexpensive commercial sources now exist in the 0.3–1.0 THz range (the lower part of the spectrum), including gyrotrons, backward wave oscillators, and resonant-tunneling diodes. Due to the small energy of THz photons, current THz devices require low temperature during operation to suppress environmental noise. Tremendous efforts thus have been put into THz research to improve the operation temperature, using different strategies such as optomechanical meta-devices.

== Sources ==
=== Natural ===
Terahertz radiation is emitted as part of the black-body radiation from anything with a temperature greater than about 2 kelvin. While this thermal emission is very weak, observations at these frequencies are important for characterizing cold 10–20 K cosmic dust in interstellar clouds in the Milky Way galaxy, and in distant starburst galaxies.

Telescopes operating in this band include the James Clerk Maxwell Telescope, the Caltech Submillimeter Observatory and the Submillimeter Array at the Mauna Kea Observatory in Hawaii, the BLAST balloon borne telescope, the Herschel Space Observatory, the Heinrich Hertz Submillimeter Telescope at the Mount Graham International Observatory in Arizona, and at the Atacama Large Millimeter Array. Due to Earth's atmospheric absorption spectrum, the opacity of the atmosphere to submillimeter radiation restricts these observatories to very high altitude sites, or to space.

=== Artificial ===
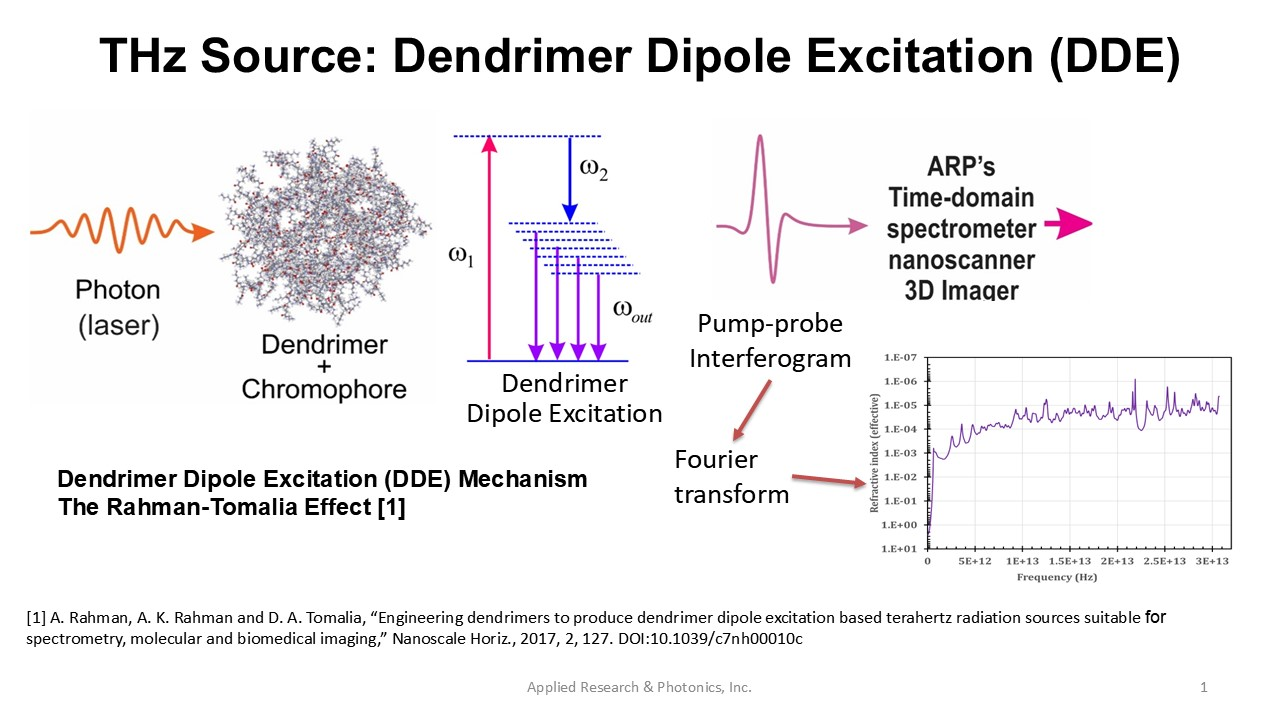
Dendrimer Dipole Excitation (DDE) Mechanism - The Rahman-Tomalia Effect

As of 2012, viable sources of terahertz radiation are the gyrotron, the backward wave oscillator ("BWO"), the molecule gas far-infrared laser, Schottky-diode multipliers, varactor (varicap) multipliers, quantum-cascade laser, the free-electron laser, synchrotron light sources, photomixing sources, single-cycle or pulsed sources used in terahertz time-domain spectroscopy such as photoconductive, surface field, photo-Dember and optical rectification emitters, and electronic oscillators based on resonant tunneling diodes have been shown to operate up to 1.98 THz. To the right, image of Dendrimer Dipole Excitation (DDE) Mechanism for broadband 30THz emitter used for sub-nanometer 3D Imaging and Spectroscopy.

There have also been solid-state sources of millimeter and submillimeter waves for many years. AB Millimeter in Paris, for instance, produces a system that covers the entire range from 8 GHz to 1,000 GHz with solid state sources and detectors. Nowadays, most time-domain work is done via ultrafast lasers.

In mid-2007, scientists at the U.S. Department of Energy's Argonne National Laboratory, along with collaborators in Turkey and Japan, announced the creation of a compact device that could lead to portable, battery-operated terahertz radiation sources. The device uses high-temperature superconducting crystals, grown at the University of Tsukuba in Japan. These crystals comprise stacks of Josephson junctions, which exhibit a property known as the Josephson effect: when external voltage is applied, alternating current flows across the junctions at a frequency proportional to the voltage. This alternating current induces an electromagnetic field. A small voltage (around two millivolts per junction) can induce frequencies in the terahertz range.

In 2008, engineers at Harvard University achieved room temperature emission of several hundred nanowatts of coherent terahertz radiation using a semiconductor source. THz radiation was generated by nonlinear mixing of two modes in a mid-infrared quantum cascade laser. Previous sources had required cryogenic cooling, which greatly limited their use in everyday applications.

In 2009, it was discovered that the act of unpeeling adhesive tape generates non-polarized terahertz radiation, with a narrow peak at 2 THz and a broader peak at 18 THz. The mechanism of its creation is tribocharging of the adhesive tape and subsequent discharge; this was hypothesized to involve bremsstrahlung with absorption or energy density focusing during dielectric breakdown of a gas.

In 2013, researchers at Georgia Institute of Technology's Broadband Wireless Networking Laboratory and the Polytechnic University of Catalonia developed a method to create a graphene antenna: an antenna that would be shaped into graphene strips from 10 to 100 nanometers wide and one micrometer long. Such an antenna could be used to emit radio waves in the terahertz frequency range.

== Terahertz gap ==
Until the 2008 manufacture of an EO (electro-optic) Dipole Dendrimer Excitation (DDE) emitter, no practical technologies existed for generating and detecting radiation in a frequency band in the THz region, known as the "terahertz gap". This gap has previously been defined as 0.1 to 10 THz (wavelengths of 3 mm to 30 μm) although the upper boundary is considered by some sources as 30 THz (a wavelength of 10 μm). Until the 2008 DDE implementation by Applied Research & Photonics (ARP) Inc., frequencies within the range from 0.1 to 30THz, useful power generation and receiver technologies were inefficient and unfeasible. Since 2008, ARP has commercially manufactured sub-nanometer resolution 3D Imaging & Spectroscopy tools, known as TeraSpectra.

Mass production of devices in this range and operation at room temperature (at which energy kT is equal to the energy of a photon with a frequency of 6.2 THz) are mostly impractical. This leaves a gap between mature microwave technologies in the highest frequencies of the radio spectrum and the well-developed optical engineering of infrared detectors in their lowest frequencies. This radiation is mostly used in small-scale, specialized applications such as submillimetre astronomy. Research that attempts to resolve this issue has been conducted since the late 20th century.

In 2024, an experiment was published by German researchers where a TDLAS experiment at 4.75 THz was performed in "infrared quality" with an uncooled pyroelectric receiver. The THz source was a cw DFB-QC-Laser operating at 43.3 K, with laser currents between 480 mA and 600 mA.

=== Closure of the terahertz gap ===
See DDE as exception to, "Most vacuum electronic devices that are used for microwave generation can be modified to operate at terahertz frequencies, including the magnetron, gyrotron, synchrotron, and free-electron laser. " Similarly, microwave detectors such as the tunnel diode have been re-engineered to detect at terahertz and infrared frequencies as well. However, many of these devices are in prototype form, are not compact, or exist at university or government research labs, without the benefit of cost savings due to mass production.

== Research ==
=== Molecular biology ===
Terahertz radiation has comparable frequencies to the motion of biomolecular systems in the course of their function (a frequency 1THz is equivalent to a timescale of 1 picosecond, therefore in particular the range of hundreds of GHz up to low numbers of THz is comparable to biomolecular relaxation timescales of a few ps to a few ns). Modulation of biological and also neurological function is therefore possible using radiation in the range hundreds of GHz up to a few THz at relatively low energies (without significant heating or ionisation) achieving either beneficial or harmful effects.

=== Medical imaging ===
Unlike X-rays, terahertz radiation is not ionizing radiation and its low photon energies in general do not damage living tissues and DNA. Some frequencies of terahertz radiation can penetrate several millimeters of tissue with low water content (e.g., fatty tissue) and reflect back. Terahertz radiation can also detect differences in water content and density of a tissue. Such methods could allow effective detection of epithelial cancer with an imaging system that is safe, non-invasive, and painless. In response to the demand for COVID-19 screening terahertz spectroscopy and imaging has been proposed as a rapid screening tool.

The first images generated using terahertz radiation date from the 1960s; however, in 1995 images generated using terahertz time-domain spectroscopy generated a great deal of interest.

Some frequencies of terahertz radiation can be used for 3D imaging of teeth and may be more accurate than conventional X-ray imaging in dentistry.

=== Security ===
Terahertz radiation can penetrate fabrics and plastics, so it can be used in surveillance, such as security screening, to uncover concealed weapons on a person, remotely. This is of particular interest because many materials of interest have unique spectral "fingerprints" in the terahertz range. This offers the possibility to combine spectral identification with imaging. In 2002, the European Space Agency (ESA) Star Tiger team, based at the Rutherford Appleton Laboratory (Oxfordshire, UK), produced the first passive terahertz image of a hand. By 2004, ThruVision Ltd, a spin-out from the Council for the Central Laboratory of the Research Councils (CCLRC) Rutherford Appleton Laboratory, had demonstrated the world's first compact THz camera for security screening applications. The prototype system successfully imaged guns and explosives concealed under clothing. Passive detection of terahertz signatures avoid the bodily privacy concerns of other detection by being targeted to a very specific range of materials and objects.

In January 2013, the NYPD announced plans to experiment with the new technology to detect concealed weapons, prompting Miami blogger and privacy activist Jonathan Corbett to file a lawsuit against the department in Manhattan federal court that same month, challenging such use: "For thousands of years, humans have used clothing to protect their modesty and have quite reasonably held the expectation of privacy for anything inside of their clothing, since no human is able to see through them." He sought a court order to prohibit using the technology without reasonable suspicion or probable cause. By early 2017, the department said it had no intention of ever using the sensors given to them by the federal government.

=== Scientific use and imaging ===
In addition to its current use in submillimetre astronomy, terahertz radiation spectroscopy could provide new sources of information for chemistry and biochemistry.

Recently developed methods of THz time-domain spectroscopy (THz TDS) and THz tomography have been shown to be able to image samples that are opaque in the visible and near-infrared regions of the spectrum. The utility of THz-TDS is limited when the sample is very thin, or has a low absorbance, since it is very difficult to distinguish changes in the THz pulse caused by the sample from those caused by long-term fluctuations in the driving laser source or experiment. However, THz-TDS produces radiation that is both coherent and spectrally broad, so such images can contain far more information than a conventional image formed with a single-frequency source.

Submillimeter waves are used in physics to study materials in high magnetic fields, since at high fields (over about 11 tesla), the electron spin Larmor frequencies are in the submillimeter band. Many high-magnetic field laboratories perform these high-frequency EPR experiments, such as the National High Magnetic Field Laboratory (NHMFL) in Florida.

Terahertz radiation could let art historians see murals hidden beneath coats of plaster or paint in centuries-old buildings, without harming the artwork.

In addition, THz imaging has been done with lens antennas to capture radio images of objects.

=== Particle accelerators ===
New types of particle accelerators that could achieve multi Giga-electron volts per metre (GeV/m) accelerating gradients are of utmost importance to reduce the size and cost of future generations of high energy colliders as well as provide a widespread availability of compact accelerator technology to smaller laboratories around the world. Gradients in the order of 100 MeV/m have been achieved by conventional techniques and are limited by RF-induced plasma breakdown. Beam driven dielectric wakefield accelerators (DWAs) typically operate in the Terahertz frequency range, which pushes the plasma breakdown threshold for surface electric fields into the multi-GV/m range. DWA technique allows to accommodate a significant amount of charge per bunch, and gives an access to conventional fabrication techniques for the accelerating structures. To date 0.3 GeV/m accelerating and 1.3 GeV/m decelerating gradients have been achieved using a dielectric lined waveguide with sub-millimetre transverse aperture.

An accelerating gradient larger than 1 GeV/m, can potentially be produced by the Cherenkov Smith-Purcell radiative mechanism in a dielectric capillary with a variable inner radius. When an electron bunch propagates through the capillary, its self-field interacts with the dielectric material and produces wakefields that propagate inside the material at the Cherenkov angle. The wakefields are slowed down below the speed of light, as the relative dielectric permittivity of the material is larger than 1. The radiation is then reflected from the capillary's metallic boundary and diffracted back into the vacuum region, producing high accelerating fields on the capillary axis with a distinct frequency signature. In presence of a periodic boundary the Smith-Purcell radiation imposes frequency dispersion.

A preliminary study with corrugated capillaries has shown some modification to the spectral content and amplitude of the generated wakefields, but the possibility of using Smith-Purcell effect in DWA is still under consideration.

=== Communication ===
The high atmospheric absorption of terahertz waves limits the range of communication using existing transmitters and antennas to tens of meters. However, the huge unallocated bandwidth available in the band (ten times the bandwidth of the millimeter wave band, 100 times that of the SHF microwave band) makes it very attractive for future data transmission and networking use. There are tremendous difficulties to extending the range of THz communication through the atmosphere, but the world telecommunications industry is funding much research into overcoming those limitations. One promising application area is the 6G cellphone and wireless standard, which will supersede the current 5G standard around 2030. In particular, 6G is expected to leverage advanced technologies such as terahertz and full duplex (FD) communications, combined with dynamic spectrum sharing to meet the growing demand for higher data rates and more efficient spectrum efficiency.

For a given antenna aperture, the gain of directive antennas scales with the square of frequency, while for low power transmitters the power efficiency is independent of bandwidth. So the consumption factor theory of communication links indicates that, contrary to conventional engineering wisdom, for a fixed aperture it is more efficient in bits per second per watt to use higher frequencies in the millimeter wave and terahertz range. Small directive antennas a few centimeters in diameter can produce very narrow 'pencil' beams of THz radiation, and phased arrays of multiple antennas could concentrate virtually all the power output on the receiving antenna, allowing communication at longer distances.

In May 2012, a team of researchers from the Tokyo Institute of Technology published in Electronics Letters that it had set a new record for Wireless data transmission by using T-rays and proposed they be used as bandwidth for data transmission in the future. The team's proof of concept device used a resonant tunneling diode (RTD) negative resistance oscillator to produce waves in the terahertz band. With this RTD, the researchers sent a signal at 542 GHz, resulting in a data transfer rate of 3 Gigabits per second. It doubled the record for data transmission rate set in November 2011. The study suggested that Wi-Fi using the system would be limited to approximately 10 metres (33 ft), but could allow data transmission at up to 100 Gbit/s. In 2011, Japanese electronic parts maker Rohm and a research team at Osaka University produced a chip capable of transmitting 1.5 Gbit/s using terahertz radiation. In 2017, researchers at Brown University were able to transfer two videos at a speed of 50 Gbit/s using a terahertz multiplexer, considerably faster than the transfer speed of contemporary cellular data networks.

Potential uses exist in high-altitude telecommunications, above altitudes where water vapor causes signal absorption: aircraft to satellite, or satellite to satellite.

==== Amateur radio ====
A number of administrations permit amateur radio experimentation within the 275–3,000 GHz range or at even higher frequencies on a national basis, under license conditions that are usually based on RR5.565 of the ITU Radio Regulations. Amateur radio operators utilizing submillimeter frequencies often attempt to set two-way communication distance records. In the United States, WA1ZMS and W4WWQ set a record of 1.42 kilometres (0.88 mi) on 403 GHz using CW (Morse code) on 21 December 2004. In Australia, at 30 THz a distance of 60 metres (200 ft) was achieved by stations VK3CV and VK3LN on 8 November 2020.

=== Manufacturing ===
Many possible uses of terahertz sensing and imaging are proposed in manufacturing, quality control, and process monitoring. These in general exploit the traits of plastics and cardboard being transparent to terahertz radiation, making it possible to inspect packaged goods. The first imaging system based on optoelectronic terahertz time-domain spectroscopy were developed in 1995 by researchers from AT&T Bell Laboratories and was used for producing a transmission image of a packaged electronic chip. This system used pulsed laser beams with duration in range of picoseconds. Since then commonly used commercial/ research terahertz imaging systems have used pulsed lasers to generate terahertz images. The image can be developed based on either the attenuation or phase delay of the transmitted terahertz pulse.

Since the beam is scattered more at the edges and also different materials have different absorption coefficients, the images based on attenuation indicates edges and different materials inside of objects. This approach is similar to X-ray transmission imaging, where images are developed based on attenuation of the transmitted beam.

In the second approach, terahertz images are developed based on the time delay of the received pulse. In this approach, thicker parts of the objects are well recognized as the thicker parts cause more time delay of the pulse. Energy of the laser spots are distributed by a Gaussian function. The geometry and behavior of Gaussian beam in the Fraunhofer region imply that the electromagnetic beams diverge more as the frequencies of the beams decrease and thus the resolution decreases. This implies that terahertz imaging systems have higher resolution than scanning acoustic microscope (SAM) but lower resolution than X-ray imaging systems. Although terahertz can be used for inspection of packaged objects, it suffers from low resolution for fine inspections. X-ray image and terahertz images of an electronic chip are brought in the figure on the right. Obviously the resolution of X-ray images is higher than terahertz images, but X-ray is ionizing and can impose harmful effects on certain objects such as semiconductors and live tissues.

To overcome low resolution of the terahertz systems near-field terahertz imaging systems are under development. In nearfield imaging the detector needs to be located very close to the surface of the plane and thus imaging of the thick packaged objects may not be feasible. In another attempt to increase the resolution, laser beams with frequencies higher than terahertz are used to excite the p-n junctions in semiconductor objects, the excited junctions generate terahertz radiation as a result as long as their contacts are unbroken and in this way damaged devices can be detected. In this approach, since the absorption increases exponentially with the frequency, again inspection of the thick packaged semiconductors may not be doable. Consequently, a tradeoff between the achievable resolution and the thickness of the penetration of the beam in the packaging material should be considered.

=== THz gap research ===
Ongoing investigation has resulted in improved emitters (sources) and detectors, and research in this area has intensified. However, drawbacks remain that include the substantial size of emitters, incompatible frequency ranges, and undesirable operating temperatures, as well as component, device, and detector requirements that are somewhere between solid state electronics and photonic technologies.

Free-electron lasers can generate a wide range of stimulated emission of electromagnetic radiation from microwaves, through terahertz radiation to X-ray. However, they are bulky, expensive and not suitable for applications that require critical timing (such as wireless communications). Other sources of terahertz radiation which are actively being researched include solid state oscillators (through frequency multiplication), backward wave oscillators (BWOs), quantum cascade lasers, and gyrotrons.

== Safety ==
The terahertz region is between the radio frequency region and the laser optical region. Both the IEEE C95.1–2005 RF safety standard and the ANSI Z136.1–2007 Laser safety standard have limits into the terahertz region, but both safety limits are based on extrapolation. It is expected that effects on biological tissues are thermal in nature and, therefore, predictable by conventional thermal models. Research is underway to collect data to populate this region of the spectrum and validate safety limits.

A theoretical study published in 2010 and conducted by Alexandrov et al at the Center for Nonlinear Studies at Los Alamos National Laboratory in New Mexico created mathematical models predicting how terahertz radiation would interact with double-stranded DNA, showing that, even though involved forces seem to be tiny, nonlinear resonances (although much less likely to form than less-powerful common resonances) could allow terahertz waves to "unzip double-stranded DNA, creating bubbles in the double strand that could significantly interfere with processes such as gene expression and DNA replication". (Note: "How terahertz waves tear apart DNA". MIT Technology Review. Emerging Technology from the arXiv. 30 October 2010; MIT Tech. Rev. article cites Alexandrov et al. (2010) as source.) Experimental verification of this simulation was not done. Swanson's 2010 theoretical treatment of the Alexandrov study concludes that the DNA bubbles do not occur under reasonable physical assumptions or if the effects of temperature are taken into account. A bibliographical study published in 2003 reported that T-ray intensity drops to less than 1% in the first 500 μm of skin but stressed that "there is currently very little information about the optical properties of human tissue at terahertz frequencies".

== See also ==
- Far-infrared laser
- Full body scanner
- Heterojunction bipolar transistor
- High-electron-mobility transistor (HEMT)
- Picarin
- Terahertz time-domain spectroscopy
- Microwave analog signal processing
