= Neutron resonance spin echo =

Quasielastic neutron scattering technique

Neutron resonance spin echo is a quasielastic neutron scattering technique developed by Gähler and Golub. In its classic form it is used analogously to conventional neutron spin echo (NSE) spectrometry for quasielastic scattering where tiny energy changes from the sample to the neutron have to be resolved. In contrast to NSE, the large magnetic solenoids are replaced by two resonant flippers respectively. This allows for variants in combination with triple axes spectrometers to resolve narrow linewidth of excitations or MIEZE (Modulation of IntEnsity with Zero Effort) for depolarizing conditions and incoherent scattering which are not possible with conventional NSE.

Neutron spin echo techniques achieve very high energy resolution in combination with very high neutron intensity by means of a decoupling of the energy resolution of the instrument from the wavelength spread of the neutrons. The energy transfer of the neutrons is encoded in their polarization and not in the change of the wavelength of the scattered neutrons. The final neutron polarization provides the (normalized) intermediate scattering function S(Q,τ), providing direct information on relaxation processes, activation energies, and the amplitudes of dynamic processes in the samples under investigation.

== How it works ==
The classical NSE technique (Figure 1. a)), relies upon the Lamor precession the neutron spin undergoes, while flying through static magnetic fields. Several other NSE schemes exist however, which employ resonant spin flips in a magnetic RF-field to achieve the same effect on the neutron, such as neutron resonant spin echo (NRSE) and modulation of intensity by zero effort (MIEZE).

In NRSE, the static magnetic fields produced by large DC coils in NSE are replaced by two resonant flipper coils, producing a static magnetic field B_{0} and a thereto perpendicular radio frequency (RF) field of frequency ω_{RF} (Figure 1. b).

A neutron entering the first resonant flipper undergoes a resonant π-flip induced by the static field B_{0} while precessing with a frequency ω_{L} (the Lamor frequency) equal to ω_{RF} and performing Rabi – oscillations due to the RF field. In classical NRSE the path between the two flippers is kept free of any magnetic field and the spin phase is not changed. In the second resonant flipper coil the neutron undergoes another resonant π-flip. The effect these two flippers have on the neutron spin is identical to the action of an effective static magnetic field as utilized in NSE.

=== Longitudinal resonance spin echo ===
The original NRSE setup was designed in a transverse configuration (T-NRSE, Figure 1. b)) where the field B_{0} lies transverse to the spin direction. In this form the energy resolution of the setup is limited by the production accuracy of the B_{0} coils to a few nanoseconds. The space between the transverse NRSE coils needs to be free of field, and is therefore shielded by a mu-metal housing. The drawbacks mentioned above lead to the development of the longitudinal NRSE (L-NRSE, Figure 1. d)) design to combine the advantages of both classical NSE and T-NRSE. In contrast to the conventional transverse NRSE technique, the cylindrically symmetric longitudinal NRSE configuration allows the use of guide fields through the whole spectrometer, reducing the effort to maintain the neutron polarization. This makes the mu-metal shielding required for transverse NRSE obsolete and facilitates maintaining the polarization of neutrons with large wavelengths λ. These neutrons are particularly important for NSE techniques, as their resolution increases with λ^{3}. Using a longitudinal field geometry, no field corrections are required for a non-divergent neutron beam while the corrections for divergent neutron trajectories are at least a factor of 10 smaller as compared to conventional NSE.

=== In combination with TAS ===
The RF flipper coils utilized in NRSE are much smaller than the DC coils used in classical NSE, leading to a large reduction in stray fields around the coils. This makes it possible to tilt the RF flipper coils and perform NRSE in a triple axis spectrometer configuration. The tilting of the coils, makes spin-echo focusing possible, where the entire energy dispersion of an excitation can be measured with very high resolution (as low as 1 μeV) over the entire Brillouin zone. Therefore, this technique allows the investigation of linewidths of dispersing excitations, including both phonons and magnons, over the entire Brillouin zone.

=== MIEZE ===
One disadvantage of classical NSE and NRSE is the fact that a depolarization of the neutron beam leads to a complete loss of signal, making it impossible to measure under depolarizing conditions, such as very large magnetic fields. Furthermore, it is not possible to measure samples that cause a depolarization of the neutron beam, such as ferromagnets, and superconductors. Due to the dominating amount of incoherent scattering, materials containing large amounts of hydrogen are also difficult to measure using conventional NSE as well as NRSE. To circumvent these drawbacks the MIEZE (Modulation of IntEnsity with Zero Effort) method was introduced in transverse as well as longitudinal configuration (Figure 1. c) and e)).

In MIEZE configuration the first two RF spin flippers are operated at different frequencies (as opposed to traditional NRSE where they operate at the same frequency), leading to a sinusoidal time modulation of the measured signal, which is detected by a time and position sensitive detector. This setup allows to place all spin manipulating devices (including the analyser) upstream of the sample, making it possible to measure (depolarizing) samples under depolarizing condition. Following the same nomenclature as NRSE transverse MIEZE refers to a configuration where the field B_{0} lies transverse to the neutron beam, while for longitudinal MIEZE the field B_{0} points along the neutron beam.

== Dedicated instruments ==
The list below provides an extensive list of neutron spin echo instruments in used (or in planning) at the moment. Most of these instruments are operated at continuous neutron sources using cold neutrons. Very few instruments are used under different conditions which are indicated below.

=== NSE ===
- SNS-NSE at the Oak Ridge National Laboratory in Tennessee, USA (spallation source)
- NSE at the National Institute of Standards and Technology in Maryland, US
- IN11 at the Institut Laue–Langevin in France
- IN15 at the Institut Laue–Langevin in France
- Wide angle Spin Echo – WASP at the Institut Laue–Langevin in France (under construction)
- J-NSE PHOENIX at the Forschungs-Neutronenquelle Heinz Maier-Leibnitz in Germany

=== NRSE ===
- RESEDA at the Forschungs-Neutronenquelle Heinz Maier-Leibnitz in Germany
- BL06 at the Japan Proton Accelerator Research Complex in Japan (using a spallation source)

=== MIEZE ===
- RESEDA at the Forschungs-Neutronenquelle Heinz Maier-Leibnitz in Germany
- BL06 at the Japan Proton Accelerator Research Complex in Japan (using a spallation source)
- MIRA at the Forschungs-Neutronenquelle Heinz Maier-Leibnitz in Germany
- MUSES at Laboratoire Léon Brillouin in France

=== Triple axis spectrometer – NRSE ===
- IN22/ZETA at the Institut Laue–Langevin in France
- TRISP at the Forschungs-Neutronenquelle Heinz Maier-Leibnitz in Germany (using thermal neutrons)
- FLEXX at the Helmholtz-Zentrum Berlin in Germany
