= Quasielastic neutron scattering =

Quasielastic neutron scattering (QENS) designates a limiting case of inelastic neutron scattering, characterized by energy transfers being small compared to the incident energy of the scattered particles. In a more strict meaning, it denotes scattering processes where dynamics in the sample (such as diffusive dynamics) lead to a broadening of the incident neutron spectrum, in contrast to, e.g., the scattering from a diffusionless crystal, where the scattered neutron energy spectrum consists of an elastic line (corresponding to no energy transfer with the sample) and a number of well-separated inelastic lines due to the creation or annihilation of phonons with specific energies.

The term quasielastic scattering was originally coined in nuclear physics. It was applied to thermal neutron scattering since the early 1960s, notably in an article by Leon van Hove and in a highly cited one by Pierre Gilles de Gennes.

QENS is typically investigated on high-resolution spectrometers (neutron backscattering, neutron time-of-flight scattering, neutron spin echo).

It is used to investigate topics like

- solid-state diffusion (e.g. hydrogen in metals)
- slow modes in crystals (e.g. methyl group rotation)
- relaxation of viscous liquids

== Conference Series ==
Starting in 1992, there is a conference series entitled QENS. Since 2012, it is being held together with the Workshop on Inelastic Neutron Spectrometry (WINS).

Year	Venue	Organizing Centre	Proceedings	Editor
1992	Windsor, UK	ISIS	?	
1993	San Sebastian, Spain	university	?	
1995	Parma, Italy	university	?	
1998	Nyköping, Sweden	Studsvik research reactor	Physica B 266 (1-2) pp. 1–138	
2000	Edinburgh, UK	university	Physica B 301 (1-2) pp. 1–168	V. Arrighi and M.T.F. Telling
2002	Potsdam/Berlin, Germany	Hahn-Meitner-Institut	Chemical Physics 292 (2-3) pp. 119–534	R.E.Lechner
2004	Arcachon, France		?	
2006	Bloomington, USA	Low Energy Neutron Source, Indiana University Cyclotron Facility	MRS Conference Series	P.E. Sokol et al.
2009	Villigen, Switzerland	Paul-Scherrer-Institut	Z. Phys. Chem. 224 (1-2) pp. 1–287	R. Hempelmann et al.
2012	Nikkō, Tochigi, Japan	J-PARC	J. Phys. Soc. Japan 82 Suppl. A (2013)	O. Yamamuro et al.
2014	Autrans, France	Institut Laue-Langevin	EPJ Web of Conferences Vol. 83 (2015)	B. Frick, M.M. Koza, M. Boehm, and H. Mutka
2016	Berlin, Germany	Helmholtz-Zentrum Berlin		M. Russina et al.

== Textbooks ==
- M. Beé, Quasielastic Neutron Scattering, Adam Hilger: Bristol (1988).
- R. Hempelmann, Quasielastic Neutron Scattering and Solid State Diffusion, Clarendon Press: Oxford (2000).
