= Neutron magnetic imaging =

Neutrons are spin 1/2 particles that interact with magnetic induction fields via the Zeeman interaction. This interaction is both rather large and simple to describe. Several neutron scattering techniques have been developed to use thermal neutrons to characterize magnetic micro and nanostructures.

== Polarized small-angle neutron scattering (SANS) ==
Small-angle neutron scattering is a technique which is especially suited for the study of nanoparticles. It has for example been used extensively for the study of ferrofluids. More recently, polarized SANS has become more widely available and a wide range of study have been performed. Polarized SANS allows either to probe the internal structure of magnetic nanoparticles via the measurement of the magnetic form factor or the magnetic interactions between magnetic nanoparticles via the structure factor. In a few cases, Polarized Grazing Incidence SANS was performed on magnetic systems

A few polarized neutrons SANS spectrometers are available across the world:

- D33 at the Institut Laue-Langevin (ILL) in Grenoble France
- PA20 at CEA Laboratoire Léon Brillouin (LLB) in Saclay, France (CEA Saclay site)
- SANS-I and KWS-1 and KWS-2 at the Forschungsneutronenquelle Heinz Maier-Leibnitz (FRM II) in Garching, Germany
- V4 at Helmholtz Zentrum Berlin

== Polarized neutron reflectometry ==
Polarized neutron reflectometry allows probing magnetic thin films and ultra-thin films. The polarized reflectivity measurements allow measuring the magnitude and directions of the magnetic induction in magnetic heterostructures with a depth resolution on the order of 2-3 nm for films with thicknesses ranging from 5 to 100 nm.

A number of polarized neutrons reflectometers are available across the world:

- Platypus at ANSTO in Sydney, Australia
- C5 spectrometer at NRC Canada Chalk River Labs in Chalk River, Canada.
- D3 reflectometer at NRC Canada Chalk River Labs in Chalk River, Canada.
- D17, SuperADAM at the Institut Laue-Langevin (ILL) in Grenoble, France
- PRISM (alternate) at CEA Laboratoire Léon Brillouin (LLB) in Saclay, France
- N-REX+, MIRA, TREFF@NoSpec and MARIA at the Forschungsneutronenquelle Heinz Maier-Leibnitz (FRM II) in Garching, Germany
- REFLEX and REMUR at Joint Institute for Nuclear Research IBR-2 in Dubna, Russia
- AMOR at the Paul Scherrer Institute (PSI) in Villigen, Switzerland
- SURF, CRISP, INTER, Offspec and polREF at the ISIS neutron source (ISIS) in Oxfordshire, United Kingdom
- NG1, NG7 at the NIST Center for Neutron Research (NCNR) in Gaithersburg, Maryland, United States
- Magnetism at the Spallation Neutron Source (ORNL) in Oak Ridge, Tennessee, United States

A catalogue of neutron reflectometers is available at www.reflectometry.net.

== Polarized Neutron Radiography and Tomography ==
=== Precession techniques ===
The neutron precession in an induction field is expressed as $\frac{d\overrightarrow{M}}{dt}=\gamma_{n}\overrightarrow{M}\times\overrightarrow{B}(r)$ where $\overrightarrow{M}$ is the neutron magnetic moment, $\overrightarrow{B}$ is the local magnetic induction at the neutron position $r(t)$ and $\gamma_{n}=g_{n}\mu_{N}/\hbar$ is the neutron gyromagnetic ratio. For neutrons, the gyromagnetic ratio is $\gamma_{n} = g_{n} \mu_{N} \hbar=183\times10^{6}rad.s^{-1}.T^{-1}=29.2 MHz.T^{-1}$ (note that for neutrons g factor is negative and equal to -3.83).

==== Bulk systems ====
Neutron radiography can be used to map the distribution of an induction field $\vec{B}(\vec{r})$ in space. In order to perform such experiments, the neutron beam is initially polarized, it interacts with the induction field of interest and the neutron precession is measured with a neutron analyzer in front of the 2D detector. The beam can be either polarized with supermirrors or with polarized 3He gaz

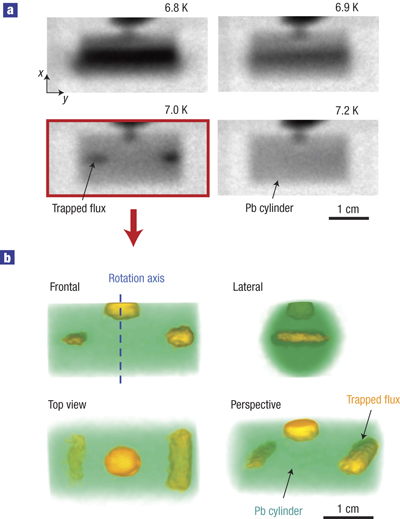
Radiographic projections of trapped flux in a polycrystalline lead cylinder at different temperatures below T_{c}=7.2 K. b, Trapped flux at 7.0 K (yellow) visualized in different tomographic views. The magnetic field strength in the sample can be analysed to be about 1.00.2 mT (yellow parts) (N. Kardjilov et al., Nature Physics 4, 399 - 403 (2008) doi:10.1038/nphys912)

==== Thin film structures ====
The neutron precession in an induction field is rather small. Thus in the case of thin films (~1 μm thick) the neutron interaction is rather small. Thus in order to obtain a measurable signal, it has been proposed that a grazing incidence geometry could be used. In such a geometry, the interaction is enhance since the neutron travels a longer path inside the induction field. Such measurements however assume that the planar structure of the system is homogeneous and that the induction varie only through the depth of the magnetic film. The magnetisation depth profile was measured in thick CoZr films in which the magnetic anisotropy field was "engineered" during deposition. A very thorough description of the measurement process can be found in.

=== Phase imaging ===
Phase contrast (or dark field) imaging has recently been developed for neutron radiography and tomography. It has been applied to visualize magnetic domains in several types of systems:

- soft magnetic alloys
- magnetic vortices in low T_{c} superconductors superconductors

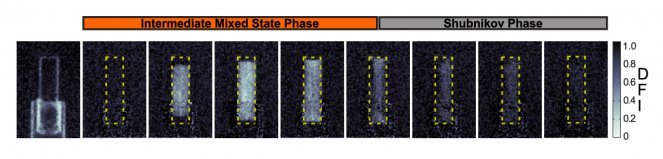
Nb Mixed phase neutron radiography

=== Scanning magnetic neutron imaging ===
Magnetic neutron radiography is currently limited in spatial resolution due to the need of analyzing the neutron polarization which results in losses in spatial resolution. It has been proposed that neutron scanning imaging could be performed by using micro beams. It is however only possible to produce 1 dimensional microbeams due to the intrinsic limitation in neutron flux. Hence this technique can presently be applied only for 1 dimensional problems.

== See also ==
- Tomography
- Tomographic reconstruction
- Neutron Tomography
