= Nuclear magnetic moment =

Magnetic moment of an atomic nucleus

The nuclear magnetic moment is the magnetic moment of an atomic nucleus and arises from the spin of the protons and neutrons. It is mainly a magnetic dipole moment; the quadrupole moment does cause some small shifts in the hyperfine structure as well. All nuclei that have nonzero spin also have a nonzero magnetic moment and vice versa, although the connection between the two quantities is not straightforward or easy to calculate.

The nuclear magnetic moment varies from isotope to isotope of an element. For a nucleus of which the numbers of protons and of neutrons are both even in its ground state (i.e. lowest energy state), the nuclear spin and magnetic moment are both always zero. In cases with odd numbers of either or both protons and neutrons, the nucleus often has nonzero spin and magnetic moment. The nuclear magnetic moment is not the sum of nucleon magnetic moments, this property being assigned to the tensorial character of the nuclear force, such as in the case of the most simple nucleus where both proton and neutron appear, namely deuterium nucleus, deuteron.

== Measurement methods ==
The methods for measuring nuclear magnetic moments can be divided into two broad groups in regard to the interaction with internal or external applied fields. Generally the methods based on external fields are more accurate.

Different experimental techniques are designed in order to measure nuclear magnetic moments of a specific nuclear state. For instance, the following techniques are aimed to measure magnetic moments of an associated nuclear state in a range of life-times τ:

- Nuclear magnetic resonance (NMR) ~ ms
- Time differential perturbed angular distribution (TDPAD) ~ μs
- Perturbed angular correlation (PAC) ~ ns
- Time differential recoil into vacuum (TDRIV) ~ ps
- Recoil into vacuum (RIV) ~ ns
- Transient field (TF) ~ ns

Techniques as Transient Field have allowed measuring the g-factor in nuclear states with life-times of few picoseconds or less.

== Shell model ==
According to the shell model, protons or neutrons tend to form pairs of opposite total angular momentum. Therefore, the magnetic moment of a nucleus with even numbers of each protons and neutrons is zero, while that of a nucleus with an odd number of protons and even number of neutrons (or vice versa) will have to be that of the remaining unpaired nucleon. For a nucleus with odd numbers of each protons and neutrons, the total magnetic moment will be some combination of the magnetic moments of both of the "last", unpaired proton and neutron.

The magnetic moment is calculated through j, l and s of the unpaired nucleon, but nuclei are not in states of well defined l and s. Furthermore, for odd–odd nuclei, there are two unpaired nucleons to be considered, as in deuterium. There is consequently a value for the nuclear magnetic moment associated with each possible l and s state combination, and the actual state of the nucleus is a superposition of these. Thus the real (measured) nuclear magnetic moment is between the values associated with the "pure" states, though it may be close to one or the other (as in deuterium).

== g-factors ==
The g-factor is a dimensionless factor associated to the nuclear magnetic moment. This parameter contains the sign of the nuclear magnetic moment, which is very important in nuclear structure since it provides information about which type of nucleon (proton or neutron) is dominating over the nuclear wave function. The positive sign is associated to the proton domination and the negative sign with the neutron domination.

The values of g^{(l)} and g^{(s)} are known as the g-factors of the nucleons.

The measured values of g^{(l)} for the neutron and the proton are according to their electric charge. Thus, in units of nuclear magneton, g^{(l)} = 0 for the neutron and g^{(l)} = 1 for the proton.

The measured values of g^{(s)} for the neutron and the proton are twice their magnetic moment (either the neutron or proton magnetic moment). In nuclear magneton units, g^{(s)} = −3.8263 for the neutron and g^{(s)} = 5.5858 for the proton.

== Gyromagnetic ratio ==
The gyromagnetic ratio, expressed in Larmor precession frequency $f=\frac{\gamma}{2\pi}B$, is of great relevance to nuclear magnetic resonance analysis. Some isotopes in the human body have unpaired protons or neutrons (or both, as the magnetic moments of a proton and neutron do not cancel perfectly) Note that in the table below, the measured magnetic dipole moments, expressed in a ratio to the nuclear magneton, may be divided by the half-integral nuclear spin to calculate dimensionless g-factors. These g-factors may be multiplied by 7.622593285(47) MHz/T, which is the nuclear magneton divided by the Planck constant, to yield Larmor frequencies (in MHz/T). If divided instead by the reduced Planck constant, which is 2π less, a gyromagnetic ratio expressed in radians is obtained, which is greater by a factor of 2π.

The quantized difference between energy levels corresponding to different orientations of the nuclear spin $\Delta E = \gamma \hbar B$. The ratio of nuclei in the lower energy state, with spin aligned to the external magnetic field, is determined by the Boltzmann distribution. Thus, multiplying the dimensionless g-factor by the nuclear magneton and the applied magnetic field, and dividing by the product of the Boltzmann constant and the temperature.

| Isotope | Magnetic dipole moment [μ_{N}] | Nuclear spin [ħ] | g-factor | Larmor frequency [MHz/T] | Gyromagnetic ratio, free atom [rad/s·μT] | Isotopic abundance | NMR sensitivity, relative to ^{1}H |
|---|---|---|---|---|---|---|---|
| Formula | μ (measured) | I | g = μ/I | ν/B = gμ_{N}/h | ω/B = γ = gμ_{N}/ħ | | |
| ^{1}H | 2.79284734(3) | 1/2 | 5.58569468 | 42.6 | 267.522208 | 99.98% | 1 |
| ^{2}H | 0.857438228(9) | 1 | 0.857438228 | 6.5 | 41.0662919 | 0.02% | |
| ^{3}H | 2.9789624656(59) | 1/2 | 5.957924931(12) | | | | |
| ^{7}Li | 3.256427(2) | 3/2 | 2.1709750 | 16.5 | 103.97704 | 92.6% | |
| ^{13}C | 0.7024118(14) | 1/2 | 1.404824 | 10.7 | 67.28286 | 1.11% | 0.016 |
| ^{14}N | 0.40376100(6) | 1 | 0.40376100 | 3.1 | 19.337798 | 99.63% | 0.001 |
| ^{19}F | 2.626868(8) | 1/2 | 5.253736 | 40.4 | 251.6233 | 100.00% | 0.83 |
| ^{23}Na | 2.217522(2) | 3/2 | 1.4784371 | 11.3 | 70.808516 | 100.00% | 0.093 |
| ^{31}P | 1.13160(3) | 1/2 | | 17.2 | 108.394 | 100.00% | 0.066 |
| ^{39}K | 0.39147(3) | 3/2 | 0.2610049 | 2.0 | 12.500612 | 93.1% | |

== Calculating the magnetic moment ==
In the shell model, the magnetic moment of a nucleon of total angular momentum j, orbital angular momentum l and spin s, is given by

$$\mu = \left\langle (l,s),j,m_j = j | \mu_z | (l,s),j,m_j = j \right\rangle .$$

Projecting with the total angular momentum j gives

$$\begin{align}
\mu &= \left\langle(l,s),j,m_j=j \left| \vec{\mu} \cdot \vec{j} \right| (l,s),j,m_j=j\right\rangle
\frac
{\left\langle (l,s)j,m_j=j \left|j_z\right| (l,s)j,m_j=j\right\rangle}
{\left\langle (l,s)j,m_j=j \left|\vec{j} \cdot \vec{j}\right| (l,s)j,m_j=j\right\rangle} \\
&= \frac{1}{j + 1} \left\langle(l,s),j,m_j=j \left|\vec{\mu} \cdot \vec{j}\right|(l,s),j,m_j=j\right\rangle
\end{align}$$

$\vec{\mu}$ has contributions both from the orbital angular momentum and the spin, with different coefficients g^{(l)} and g^{(s)}:

$$\vec{\mu} = g^{(l)}\vec{l} + g^{(s)}\vec{s}$$

by substituting this back to the formula above and rewriting

$$\begin{align}
\vec{l}\cdot\vec{j} &= \frac{1}{2}\left(\vec{j} \cdot \vec{j} + \vec{l} \cdot \vec{l} - \vec{s} \cdot \vec{s}\right) \\
\vec{s}\cdot\vec{j} &= \frac{1}{2}\left(\vec{j} \cdot \vec{j} - \vec{l} \cdot \vec{l} + \vec{s} \cdot \vec{s}\right) \\
\mu &= \frac{1}{j + 1}\left\langle(l,s),j,m_j=j\left|
g^{(l)}\frac{1}{2}\left(\vec{j} \cdot \vec{j} + \vec{l} \cdot \vec{l} - \vec{s} \cdot \vec{s}\right) +
g^{(s)}\frac{1}{2}\left(\vec{j} \cdot \vec{j} - \vec{l} \cdot \vec{l} + \vec{s} \cdot \vec{s}\right)
\right|(l,s),j,m_j=j\right\rangle \\
&= \frac{1}{j + 1}\left(g^{(l)}\frac{1}{2} \left[j(j + 1) + l(l + 1) - s(s + 1)\right] + g^{(s)}\frac{1}{2} \left[j(j + 1) - l(l + 1) + s(s + 1)\right]\right)
\end{align}$$

For a single nucleon $s =1/2$. For $j = l+1/2$ we get

$$\mu_j = g^{(l)} l + {1\over 2}g^{(s)}$$

and for $j = l - 1/2$

$$\mu_j = {j \over j + 1} \left( g^{(l)}(l + 1) - \frac{1}{2}g^{(s)} \right)$$

== See also ==
- Magnetic moment
- Nuclear magneton
- Gyromagnetic ratio
- Electron magnetic moment
- Nucleon magnetic moment
- Deuterium magnetic moment
- Proton spin crisis

== Bibliography ==
- Nersesov, E.A. (1990). Fundamentals of atomic and nuclear physics. Moscow: Mir Publishers. ISBN 5-06-001249-2.
- Sergei Vonsovsky (1975). Magnetism of Elementary Particles. Mir Publishers.
- Hans Kopfermann Kernmomente and Nuclear Momenta (Akademische Verl., 1940, 1956, and Academic Press, 1958)
