= Suzanne te Velthuis =

Dutch-American materials scientist and physicist

Suzanne Gabriëlle Everdine te Velthuis (born 1968) is a Dutch and American materials scientist and physicist whose research in the Materials Science Division of the Argonne National Laboratory has included the use of neutron magnetic imaging to study thin films and nanostructures, the room-temperature generation of magnetic skyrmion bubbles on thin films for high-density computer memory, and the observation of Hall effect deflections on the movement of skyrmions.

== Education and career ==
Te Velthuis is originally from Heerlen, where she was born in 1968. She has a master's degree in applied physics from the Eindhoven University of Technology, received in 1993, with a thesis supervised by Wim J. M. de Jonge. She completed a Ph.D. in 1999 at the Delft University of Technology in The Netherlands, with the dissertation Phase Transformations in Steel – A Neutron Depolarization Study, promoted by Sybrand van der Zwaag and M. Theo Rekveldt.

She joined the Argonne National Laboratory in 1999, originally as a postdoctoral researcher. At Argonne, she participated in the National School on Neutron and X-ray Scattering from 1999 to 2017, including ten years as a scientific director of the school. From 2001 to 2009, she worked on the POSY1 polarized neutron reflectometer as instrument scientist.

She has served the American Physical Society as chair of the Topical Group on Magnetism and its Applications, and the Neutron Scattering Society of America as its secretary from 2005 to 2010.

== Recognition ==
Te Velthuis is a Fellow of the American Physical Society, elected in 2014 after a nomination from the APS Division of Condensed Matter Physics, "for contributions to the understanding of magnetic heterostructures utilizing polarized neutron reflectivity". In 2018 she was named as a Fellow of the Neutron Scattering Society of America.
