= Spectrometry =

Spectrometry may refer to:

- Optical spectrometry, a technique for measuring the distribution of light across the optical spectrum, from the ultraviolet spectral region to the visible and infrared
- Ion-mobility spectrometry, an analytical technique used to separate and identify ionized molecules in the gas phase based on their ion mobility in a carrier buffer gas
- Mass spectrometry, an analytical technique that measures the mass-to-charge ratio of charged particles
- Rutherford backscattering spectrometry, an analytical technique used to determine the structure and composition of materials by measuring the back-scattering of a beam of high energy ions impinging on a sample
- Neutron triple-axis spectrometry, a technique used in inelastic neutron scattering
- Gamma-spectrometry, a method used to acquire a quantitative gamma-spectrum measurement
- Nuclear magnetic resonance spectroscopy, a technique that uses radio frequency pulses and a magnetic field to study the properties of atomic nuclei.

== See also ==
- Spectrometer
- Spectrophotometry
- Spectroscopy
