= Spin echo small angle neutron scattering =

Measure of structures from around 20 to 2000 nm in size

Spin echo small angle neutron scattering (SESANS) is the small-angle version of neutron spin echo scattering. The information is presented as a real-space (similar to g(r)) as opposed to a reciprocal space (q(r)) mapping. This can simplify the interpretation for some systems.

SESANS is useful for studying processes that occur for large structures over relatively long time scales, as data collection is often slow. It can achieve a resolution from around 20 to 2000 nm. Aggregation of colloids, block copolymer micelles, Stöber silica particles being a prime examples.

The technique offers some advantages over SANS but there are fewer SESANS instruments available than SANS instruments. Facilities for SESANS exist at TUDelft (Netherlands) and Rutherford Appleton Laboratory (UK).
