= Quasielastic scattering =

In physics, quasielastic scattering designates a limiting case of inelastic scattering, characterized by energy transfers being small compared to the incident energy of the scattered particles.

The term was originally coined in nuclear physics.

It was applied to thermal neutron scattering by Leon van Hove and Pierre Gilles de Gennes (quasielastic neutron scattering, QENS).

Finally, it is sometimes used for dynamic light scattering (also known by the more expressive term photon correlation spectroscopy).
