= Unit for Viral Host Cell Interactions =

The Unit of Virus Host Interactions (UVHCI) UMI 3265 UJF-EMBL-CNRS was created in Grenoble, France, in January 2007 to develop the collaboration between the Joseph Fourier University, the EMBL Grenoble outstation and the CNRS. The UVHCI was located on the Polygone Scientifique (research campus of the ILL, the ESRF and the EMBL), more specifically in the ILL20 and Carl-Ivar Bränden buildings. The CIBB is shared with the PSB (Partnership for structural biology). The project ended in January 2016, after a period of 9 years. The previous UVHCI teams have been reattached to the Institut de biologie structurale (IBS).

Its objective was to pursue international standard research in structural and molecular biology, focused, but not exclusively, on virus-host cell interactions and the development of associated techniques.

Themes:

- Interdisciplinary research covering virus structure, virus assembly and maturation, virus-host cell interactions, host and virus gene expression mechanisms, cell biology of infected cells, innate immunity, anti-pathogen drug design.
- Methods developments and technical platforms for structural biology. High throughput expression and crystallization, synchrotron X-ray and neutron diffraction methods and instrumentation, LIMS, electron microscopy.
