= Institut Laue–Langevin =

Internationally financed scientific facility

Coordinates: 45.206239°N 5.692774°E

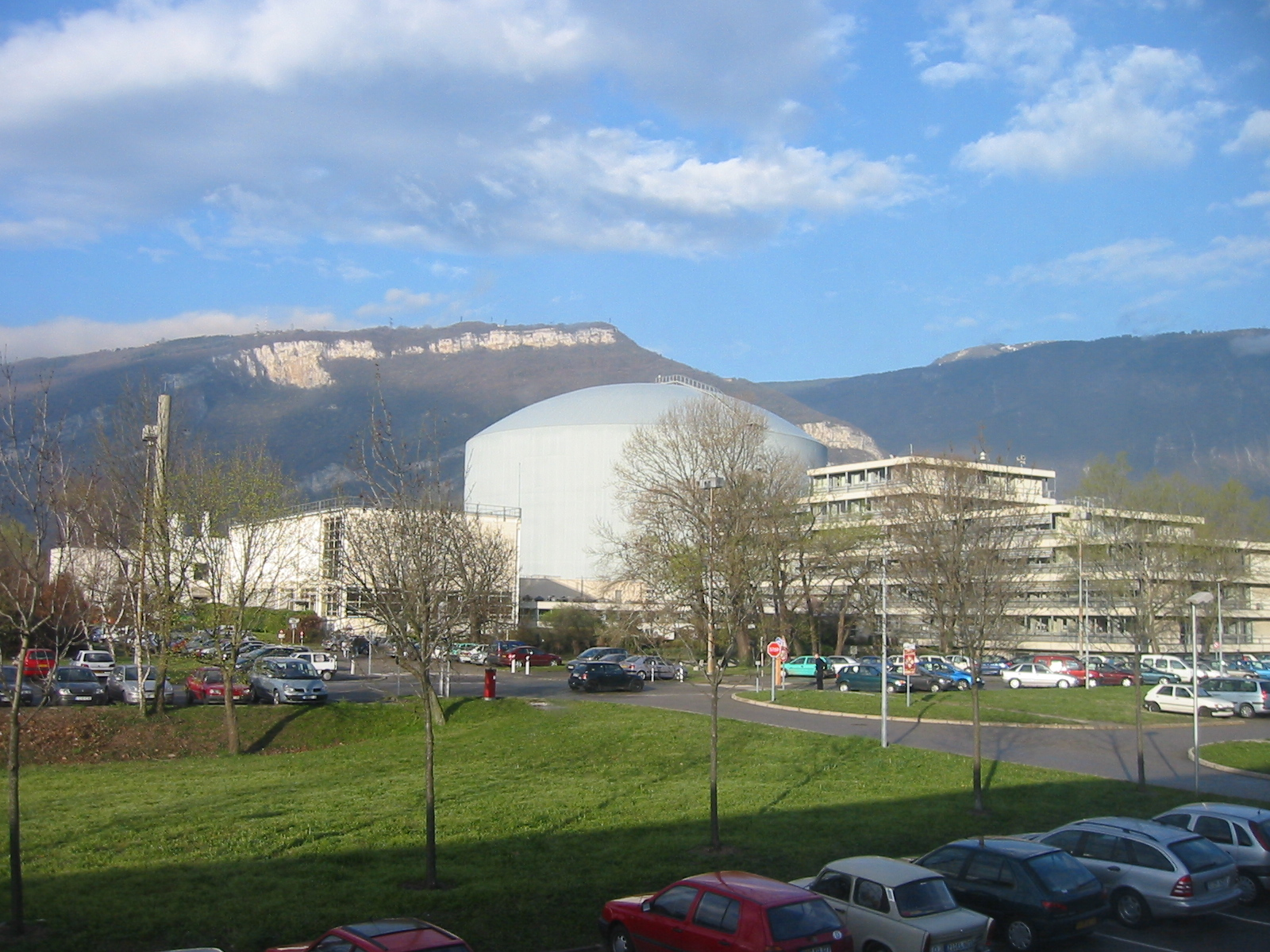
Institut Laue-Langevin

The Institut Laue–Langevin (ILL) is an internationally-financed scientific facility, situated on the Polygone Scientifique in Grenoble, France. It is one of the world centres for research using neutrons. Founded in 1967 and honouring the physicists Max von Laue and Paul Langevin, the RHF research reactor at ILL provides the most intense continuous neutron flux available in the world as of 2017.

The ILL neutron scattering facilities allow the analysis of the structure of conducting and magnetic materials for future electronic devices, the measurement of stresses in mechanical materials. It also allows investigations into macromolecular assemblies, particularly protein dynamics and biomolecular structure. It is a world-renowned centre for nanoscale science.

== History ==
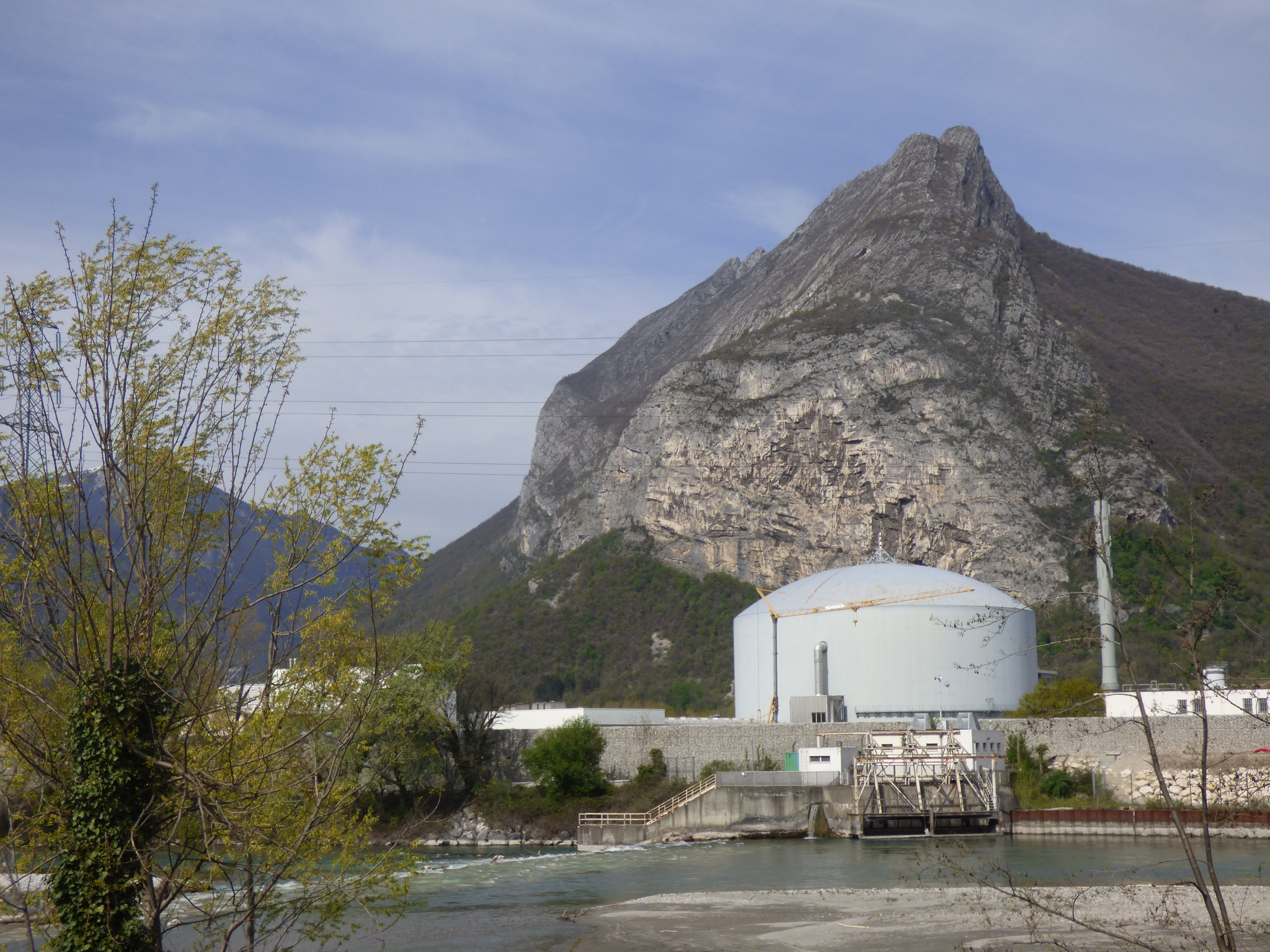
Water input for ESRF, CNRS and ILL on the river Drac

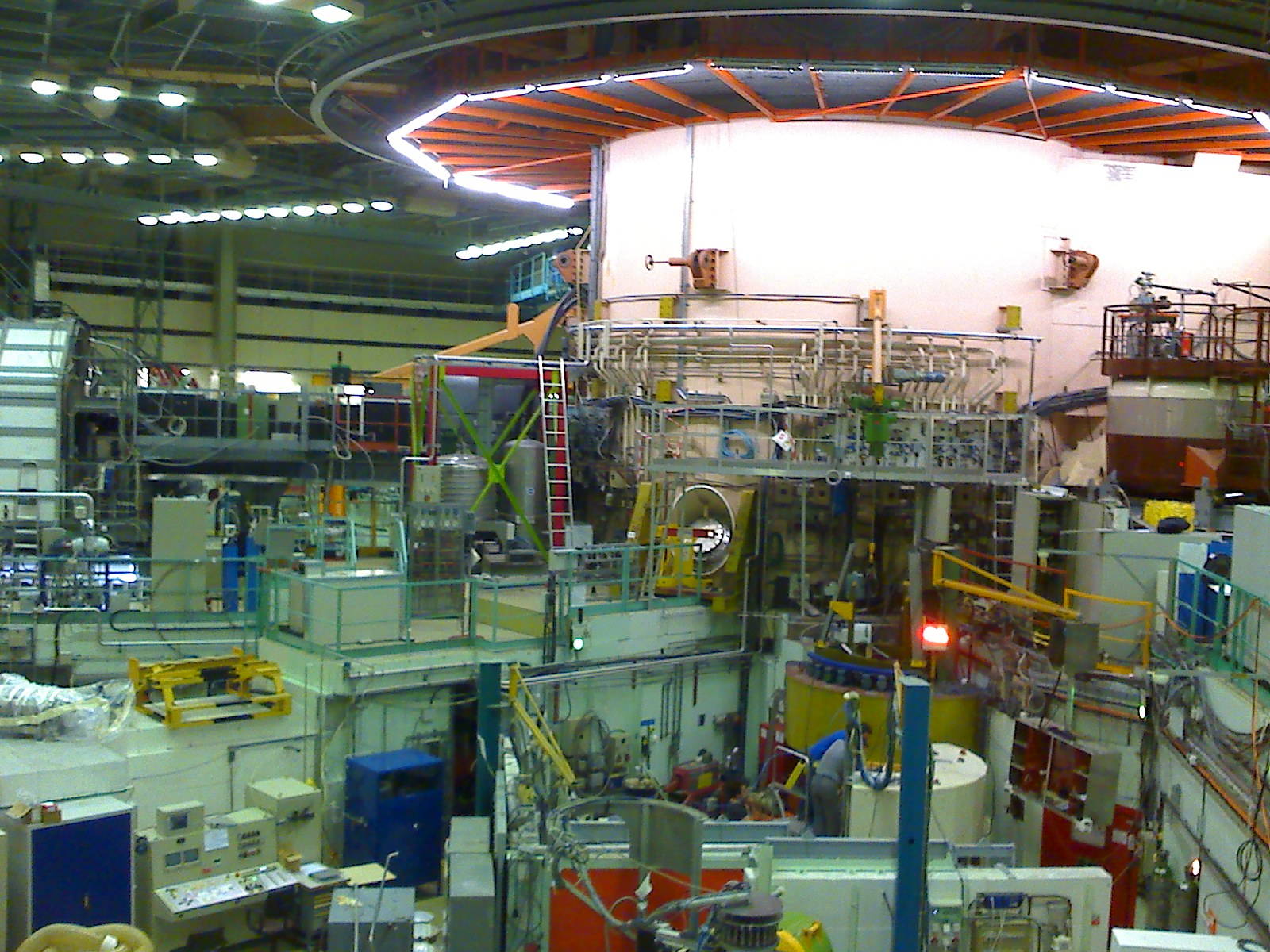
Inside the reactor hall

The institute was founded by France and Germany, with the United Kingdom becoming the third major partner in 1973. These partner states provide, through Research Councils, the bulk of its funding. Ten other countries have since become partners. Scientists of institutions in the member states may apply to use the ILL facilities, and may invite scientists from other countries to participate. Experimental time is allocated by a scientific council involving ILL users. The use of the facility and travel costs for researchers are paid for by the institute. Commercial use, for which a fee is charged, is not subject to the scientific council review process. Over 750 experiments are completed every year, in fields including magnetism, superconductivity, materials engineering, and the study of liquids, colloids and biological substances such as proteins.

The institute houses a high-flux research reactor, the French High Flux Reactor (RHF), designed primarily for neutron scattering experiments. The RHF is a heavy water-moderated research reactor using highly-enriched (93%) UAl_{x} plate-type metal fuel. The reactor produces 58.3 MW of thermal power, and delivers one of the highest neutron fluxes available in the world (1.5×10^{15} neutrons per cm^{2} per second). Neutrons are directed from the core at a suite of instruments to probe the structure and behaviour of many forms of matter by elastic and inelastic neutron scattering, and to probe the fundamental physical properties of the neutron. Fission products and gamma rays produced by nuclear reactions in the reactor core are also used by the instrument suite.

In 2000 began the introduction of new instruments and instrument upgrades. The first phase has already resulted in a 17-fold gains in performance. The second phase started in 2008: it comprises the building of 5 new instruments, the upgrade of 4 others, and the installation of 3 new neutron guides.

== EPN Science Campus ==
The ILL shares its site, the epn science campus [sic] (European Photon & Neutron (EPN) Science Campus), with other institutions including the European Synchrotron Radiation Facility (ESRF) and the European Molecular Biology Laboratory (EMBL) and the Unit for Viral Host Cell Interactions (UVHCI). The French Institut de Biologie Structural (IBS) joined the campus in 2013.

== Participants ==
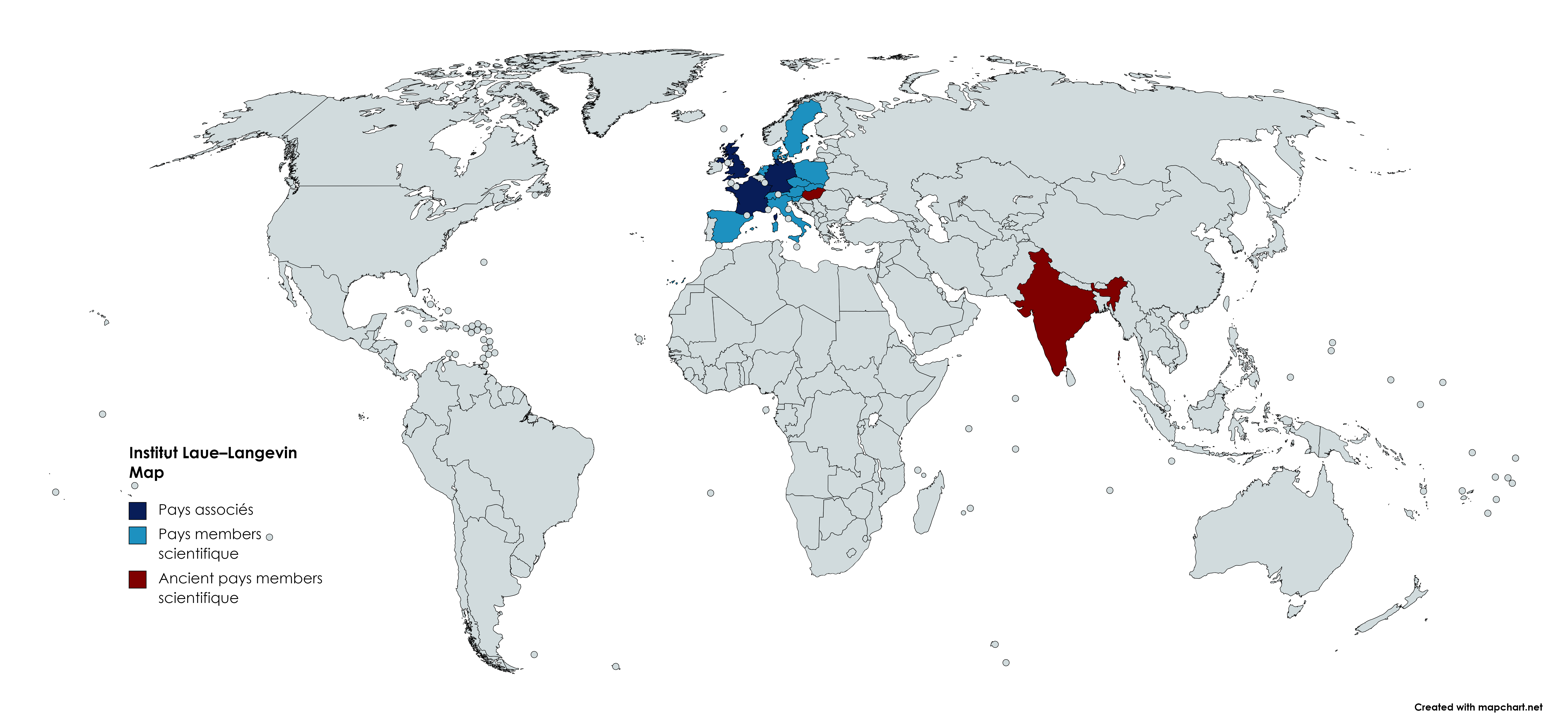
Institut Laue Langevin Map

The ILL is governed by its Associates.

Associate status and "Scientific Membership"
Country	Time	Status
France	1967-	Associate
Germany	1967-	Associate
United Kingdom	1974-	Associate
Spain	1987-	Scientific Membership
Switzerland	1988-	Scientific Membership
Austria	1990-	Scientific Membership
Italy	1997-	Scientific Membership
Czechia	1999-	Scientific Membership
Sweden	2005-	Scientific Membership
Hungary	2005-2013	Scientific Membership
Belgium	2006-	Scientific Membership
Poland	2006-	Scientific Membership
Denmark	2009-	Scientific Membership
Slovakia	2009-	Scientific Membership
India	2011-2014	Scientific Membership
Slovenia	2020-	Scientific Membership

== Applications research ==
In 2019, researchers unravelled information about a protein causing progressive diseases.

In summer 2016 the Institut Laue–Langevin demonstrated that a molecule called ectoine is used by Halomonas titanicae near the wreck of RMS Titanic to survive the osmotic pressure that salt water causes on their membranes.

== Awards and recognitions ==
The physicist Duncan Haldane who worked at the institute from 1977 to 1981 received the Nobel Prize in Physics in 2016 with Michael Kosterlitz and David J. Thouless for their work on the transitions of topological phases in the material.

Rudolf Mössbauer, Nobel Prize in Physics in 1961, succeeded Heinz Maier-Leibnitz in 1972 as the director of the institute.

The physicist Philippe Nozières, who worked at the institute from 1972 until his retirement, received the Wolf Prize in 1985, together with Conyers Herring, for their major contributions to the fundamental theory of solids, especially the behaviour of electrons in metals.

== Techniques ==
- Neutron diffraction
  - Small angle neutron scattering
  - Neutron reflectometry
- Inelastic neutron scattering
  - Neutron triple-axis spectrometry
  - Neutron time-of-flight scattering
  - Neutron backscattering
  - Neutron spin echo
- Neutron imaging

== See also ==
- Inorganic Crystal Structure Database (ICSD)

== Sources ==
- Le Journal du CNRS, printemps 2019: Ces laboratoires qui illuminent l'Europe
- medicalxpress.com Alzheimer's disease markers could be identified through protein water mobility
