= Neutron microscope =

Type of microscope

Neutron microscopes use neutrons focused by small-angle neutron scattering to create images by passing neutrons through an object to be investigated. The neutrons that aren't absorbed by the object hit scintillation targets where induced nuclear fission of lithium-6 can be detected and be used to produce an image.

Neutrons have no electric charge, enabling them to penetrate substances to gain information about structure that is not accessible through other forms of microscopy. As of 2013, neutron microscopes offered four-fold magnification and 10-20 times better illumination than pinhole neutron cameras. The system increases the signal rate at least 50-fold.

Neutrons interact with atomic nuclei via the strong force. This interaction can scatter neutrons from their original path and can also absorb them. Thus, a neutron beam becomes progressively less intense as it moves deeper within a substance. In this way, neutrons are analogous to x-rays for studying object interiors.

Darkness in an x-ray image corresponds to the amount of matter the x-rays pass through. The density of a neutron image provides information on neutron absorption. Absorption rates vary by many orders of magnitude among the chemical elements.

While neutrons have no charge, they do have spin and therefore a magnetic moment that can interact with external magnetic fields.

== Applications ==
Neutron imaging has potential for studying so-called soft materials, as small changes in the location of hydrogen within a material can produce highly visible changes in a neutron image.

Neutrons also offer unique capabilities for research in magnetic materials. The neutron's lack of electric charge means there is no need to correct magnetic measurements for errors caused by stray electric fields and charges. Polarized neutron beams orient neutron spins in one direction. This allows measurement of the strength and characteristics of a material's magnetism.

Neutron-based instruments have the ability to probe inside metal objects — such as fuel cells, batteries and engines to study their internal structure. Neutron instruments are also uniquely sensitive to lighter elements that are important in biological materials.

== Shadowgraphs ==
Shadowgraphs are images produced by casting a shadow on a surface, usually taken with a pinhole camera and are widely used for nondestructive testing. Such cameras provide low illumination levels that require long exposure times. They also provide poor spatial resolution. The resolution of such a lens cannot be smaller than the hole diameter. A good balance between illumination and resolution is obtained when the pinhole diameter is about 100 times smaller than the distance between the pinhole and the image screen, effectively making the pinhole an f/100 lens. The resolution of an f/100 pinhole is about half a degree.

== Wolter mirror ==
Glass lenses and conventional mirrors are useless for working with neutrons, because they pass through such materials without refraction or reflection. Instead, the neutron microscope employs a Wolter mirror, similar in principle to grazing incidence mirrors used for x-ray and gamma-ray telescopes.

When a neutron grazes the surface of a metal at a sufficiently small angle, it is reflected away from the metal surface at the same angle. When this occurs with light, the effect is called total internal reflection. The critical angle for grazing reflection is large enough (a few tenths of a degree for thermal neutrons) that a curved mirror can be used. Curved mirrors then allow an imaging system to be made.

The microscope uses several reflective cylinders nested inside each other, to increase the surface area available for reflection.

== Measurement ==
The neutron flux at the imaging focal plane is measured by a CCD imaging array with a neutron scintillation screen in front of it. The scintillation screen is made of zinc sulfide, a fluorescent compound, laced with lithium. When a thermal neutron is absorbed by a lithium-6 nucleus, it causes a fission reaction that produces helium, tritium and energy. These fission products cause the ZnS phosphor to light up, producing an optical image for capture by the CCD array.

== See also ==
- Electron microscope
- ISIS neutron and muon source
- LARMOR neutron microscope
- Microscope image processing
- X-ray microscope
