= Inelastic scattering =

Particle scattering in which kinetic energy is not conserved

In chemistry, nuclear physics, and particle physics, inelastic scattering is a process in which the internal states of a particle or a system of particles change after a collision. Often, this means the kinetic energy of the incident particle is not conserved (in contrast to elastic scattering). Additionally, relativistic collisions which involve a transition from one type of particle to another are referred to as inelastic even if the outgoing particles have the same kinetic energy as the incoming ones. Processes which are governed by elastic collisions at a microscopic level will appear to be inelastic if a macroscopic observer only has access to a subset of the degrees of freedom. In Compton scattering for instance, the two particles in the collision transfer energy causing a loss of energy in the measured particle.

== Electrons ==
When an electron is the incident particle, the probability of inelastic scattering, depending on the energy of the incident electron, is usually smaller than that of elastic scattering. Thus in the case of gas electron diffraction (GED), reflection high-energy electron diffraction (RHEED), and transmission electron diffraction, because the energy of the incident electron is high, the contribution of inelastic electron scattering can be ignored. Deep inelastic scattering of electrons from protons provided the first direct evidence for the existence of quarks.

== Photons ==
When a photon is the incident particle, there is an inelastic scattering process called Raman scattering. In this scattering process, the incident photon interacts with matter (gas, liquid, and solid) and the frequency of the photon is shifted towards red or blue. A red shift can be observed when part of the energy of the photon is transferred to the interacting matter, where it adds to its internal energy in a process called Stokes Raman scattering. The blue shift can be observed when internal energy of the matter is transferred to the photon; this process is called anti-Stokes Raman scattering.

Inelastic scattering is seen in the interaction between an electron and a photon. When a high-energy photon collides with a free electron (more precisely, weakly bound since a free electron cannot participate in inelastic scattering with a photon) and transfers energy, the process is called Compton scattering. Furthermore, when an electron with relativistic energy collides with an infrared or visible photon, the electron gives energy to the photon. This process is called inverse Compton scatteringBornikov, Kirill (June 3, 2023). "Notes on the inverse Compton scattering". Moscow University Physics Bulletin. 78 (4): 453. arXiv:2306.02160. Bibcode:2023MUPB...78..453B. doi:10.3103/S0027134923040045..

== Neutrons ==
Neutrons undergo many types of scattering, including both elastic and inelastic scattering. Whether elastic or inelastic scatter occurs is dependent on the speed of the neutron, whether fast or thermal, or somewhere in between. It is also dependent on the nucleus it strikes and its neutron cross section. In inelastic scattering, the neutron interacts with the nucleus and the kinetic energy of the system is changed. This often activates the nucleus, putting it into an excited, unstable, short-lived energy state which causes it to quickly emit some kind of radiation to bring it back down to a stable or ground state. Alpha, beta, gamma, and protons may be emitted. Particles scattered in this type of nuclear reaction may cause the nucleus to recoil in the other direction.

== Molecular collisions ==
Inelastic scattering is common in molecular collisions. Any collision which leads to a chemical reaction will be inelastic, but the term inelastic scattering is reserved for those collisions which do not result in reactions. There is a transfer of energy between the translational mode (kinetic energy) and rotational and vibrational modes.

If the transferred energy is small compared to the incident energy of the scattered particle, one speaks of quasielastic scattering.

== See also ==
- Inelastic collision
- Elastic scattering
- Scattering theory
