= Dynamic structure factor =

Function in condensed matter physics

In condensed matter physics, the dynamic structure factor (or dynamical structure factor) is a mathematical function that contains information about inter-particle correlations and their time evolution. It is a generalization of the structure factor that considers correlations in both space and time. Experimentally, it can be accessed most directly by inelastic neutron scattering or X-ray Raman scattering.

The dynamic structure factor is most often denoted $S(\vec{k},\omega)$, where $\vec{k}$ (sometimes $\vec{q}$) is a wave vector (or wave number for isotropic materials), and $\omega$ a frequency (sometimes stated as energy, $\hbar\omega$). It is defined as:

$$S(\vec{k},\omega) \equiv \frac{1}{2\pi}\int_{-\infty}^{\infty} F(\vec{k},t)\exp(i\omega t)\,dt$$

Here $F(\vec{k},t)$, is called the intermediate scattering function and can be measured by neutron spin echo spectroscopy. The intermediate scattering function is the spatial Fourier transform of the van Hove function $G(\vec{r},t)$:

$$F(\vec{k},t) \equiv \int G(\vec{r},t)\exp (-i\vec{k}\cdot\vec{r})\,d\vec{r}$$

Thus we see that the dynamical structure factor is the spatial and temporal Fourier transform of van Hove's time-dependent pair correlation function. It can be shown (see below), that the intermediate scattering function is the correlation function of the Fourier components of the density $\rho$:

$$F(\vec{k},t) = \frac{1}{N}\langle \rho_{\vec{k}}(t)\rho_{-\vec{k}}(0) \rangle$$

The dynamic structure is exactly what is probed in coherent inelastic neutron scattering. The differential cross section is :

$$\frac{d^2 \sigma}{d\Omega d\omega} = a^2\left(\frac{E_f}{E_i}\right)^{1/2} S(\vec{k},\omega)$$

where $a$ is the scattering length.

== The van Hove function ==
The van Hove function for a spatially uniform system containing $N$ point particles is defined as:

$$G(\vec{r},t) = \left\langle \frac{1}{N} \int \sum_{i=1}^{N}\sum_{j=1}^N \delta[\vec{r}'+\vec{r}-\vec{r}_j(t)]\delta[\vec{r}'-\vec{r}_i(0)] d\vec{r}' \right\rangle$$

It can be rewritten as:

$$G(\vec{r},t) = \left\langle \frac{1}{N}\int \rho(\vec{r}'+\vec{r},t)\rho(\vec{r}',0) d\vec{r}'\right\rangle$$
