= Ian Hamley =

British academic (born 1965)

Ian Hamley FRSC
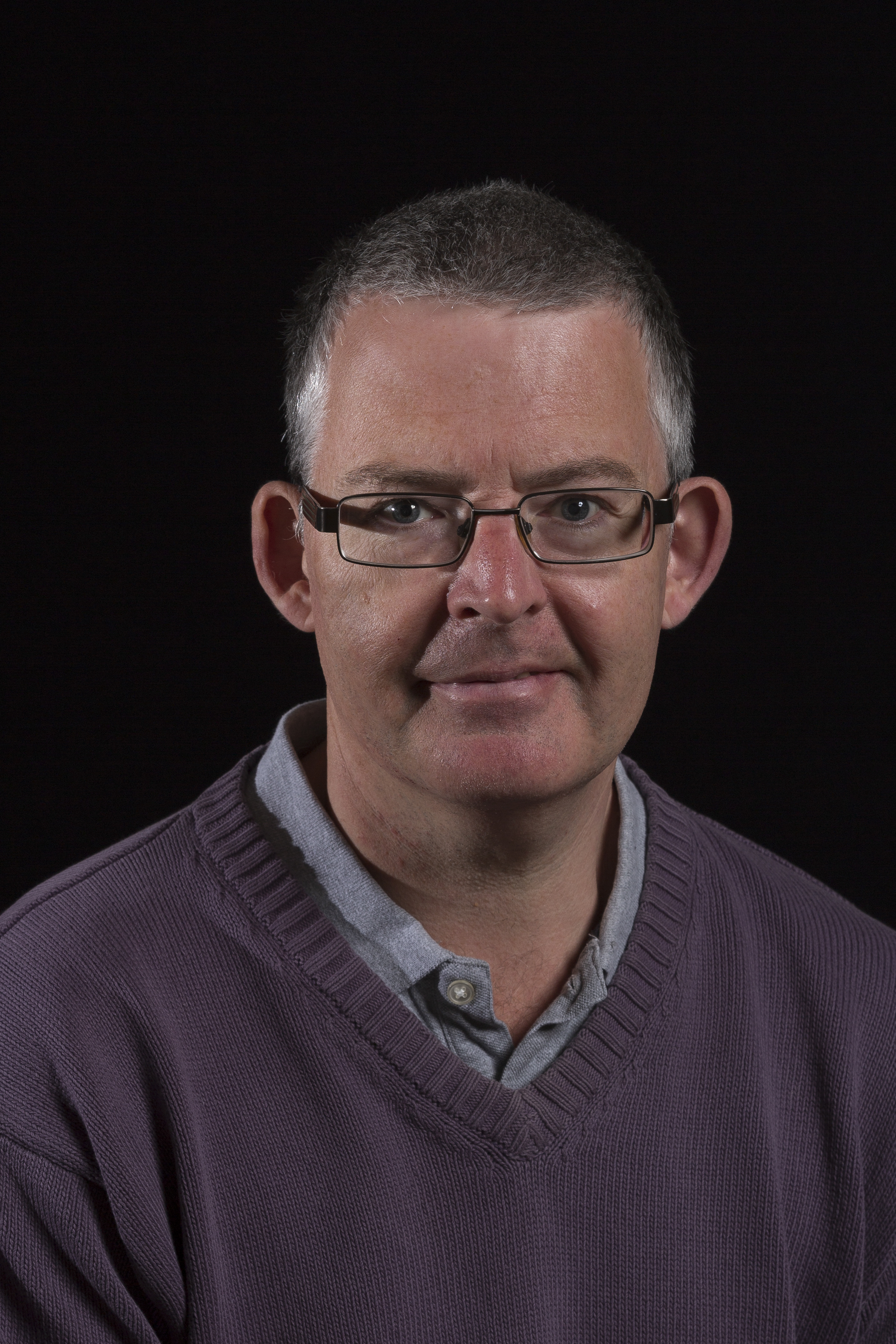
- Born: Ian Hamley; 1965 (age 60–61); Reading, Berkshire, England
- Education: University of Reading (BSc); University of Southampton (PhD)
- Awards: Royal Society Woolfson Research Merit Award Holder (2011–2016): RSC Peter Day Award for Materials Chemistry 2016; MacroGroup UK Medal for Contribution to UK Polymer Science 2016
- Scientific career
- Fields: soft matter; polymers; peptides; block copolymers
- Institutions: University of Reading; University of Leeds; University of Durham; University of Minnesota; AMOLF
- Thesis: Scattering and Order in Thermotropic Liquid Crystals (1991)
- Doctoral advisor: Geoffrey Luckhurst and John Seddon
- Website: University listing

Ian Hamley (born 1965) is a British academic who is the Diamond Professor of Physical Chemistry at the University of Reading. He is a soft matter scientist and physical chemist with research expertise in self-assembling molecules including polymers, peptides and other biomolecules. He has more than 400 published scientific papers. He is the author of 'The Physics of Block Copolymers', 'Introduction to Soft Matter', 'Block Copolymers in Solution', 'Introduction to Peptide Science', and 'Small-Angle Scattering: Theory, Instrumentation, Data and Applications', as well as several edited texts.

== Career ==
After postdoctoral research at AMOLF (FOM Institute for Atomic and Molecular Physics, Amsterdam) and University of Minnesota, Hamley was appointed as lecturer in Physics at the University of Durham in 1993 where he worked until 1995. He moved to the Department of Chemistry at the University of Leeds in 1995 and was promoted to become Professor of Polymer Materials and Director of the Centre for Self-Organising Molecular Systems in 2004. He moved to the University of Reading as Diamond Professor of Physical Chemistry in 2005. This was a five-year, joint appointment with Diamond Light Source.

His past research concerned the self-assembly of block copolymers. Most recently he has developed interests in peptide and peptide conjugate self-assembly, including molecules with bioactivity such as amyloid peptides peptide hormones, antimicrobial peptides, peptides in cosmetic applications and peptides with anti-cancer activity. Several of these show promise as therapeutics.

== Awards and honours ==
Hamley was a Royal Society-Woolfson Research Merit Award Holder 2011–2016 and won the RSC Peter Day award for Materials Chemistry in 2016 and the MacroGroup UK Medal for Contribution to UK Polymer Science in 2016.

== Lecturing career ==
Hamley has lectured at the University of Reading since 2005, specialising in physical chemistry teaching modules on thermodynamics and surface and interface chemistry.
