= Neutron scattering length =

A neutron may pass by a nucleus with a probability determined by the nuclear interaction distance, or be absorbed, or undergo scattering that may be either coherent or incoherent. The interference effects in coherent scattering can be computed via the coherent scattering length of neutrons, being proportional to the amplitude of the spherical scattered waves according to Huygens–Fresnel theory. This scattering length varies by isotope (and by element as the weighted arithmetic mean over the constituent isotopes) in a way that appears random, whereas the X-ray scattering length is just the product of atomic number and Thomson scattering length, thus monotonically increasing with atomic number.

The scattering length may be either positive or negative. The scattering cross-section is equal to the square of the scattering length multiplied by 4π, i.e. the area of a circle with radius twice the scattering length. In some cases, as with titanium and nickel, it is possible to mix isotopes of an element whose lengths are of opposite signs to give a net scattering length of zero, in which case coherent scattering will not occur at all, while for vanadium already the opposite signs of the only naturally occurring isotope's two spin configurations give a near cancellation. However, neutrons will still undergo strong incoherent scattering in these materials.

There is a large difference in scattering length between protium (^{1}H) (-0.374) and deuterium (^{2}H) (0.667). By using heavy water as solvent and/or selective deuteration of the probed molecule (exchanging the naturally occurring protium by deuterium) this difference can be leveraged in order to image the hydrogen configuration in organic matter, which is nearly impossible with X-rays due to their small sensitivity to hydrogen's single electron. On the other hand, neutron scattering studies of hydrogen-containing samples often suffer from the strong incoherent scattering of natural hydrogen.

| element | protons | isotope | neutron scattering length b_{coh} (fm) | coherent cross-section σ_{coh} (barn) | incoherent cross-section σ_{inc} (barn) | absorption cross-section σ_{a} (barn) |
|---|---|---|---|---|---|---|
| Hydrogen | 1 | 1 | -3.74 | 1.758 | 79.7, 80.27 | 0.33, 0.383 |
| Hydrogen | 1 | 2 | 6.67 | 5.592 | 2.0, 2.05 | 0.0005 |
| Boron | 5 | natural | 5.30 | 3.54 | 1.70 | 767.0 |
| Carbon | 6 | 12 | 6.65 | 5.550 | 0.0, 0.001 | 0.0035, 0.004 |
| Nitrogen | 7 | 14 | 9.36, 9.40, 9.4 | 11.01 | 0.3, 0.5 | 1.9 |
| Oxygen | 8 | 16 | 5.80, 5.8 | 4.232 | 0.0, 0.000 | 0.00019, 0.0002 |
| Aluminum | 13 | 27 (natural) | 3.45, 3.5 | 1.495 | 0.0, 0.008 | 0.23, 0.231 |
| Silicon | 14 | natural | 4.2 | | 0.0 | 0.17 |
| Phosphorus | 15 | 30 | 5.10 | | | |
| Sulfur | 16 | 32 | 2.80, 2.8 | | | |
| Titanium | 22 | natural | -3.44, -3.4 | 1.485 | 2.87, 3.0 | 6.09, 6.1 |
| Vanadium | 23 | natural | -0.38 | 0.018 | 5.07 | 5.08 |
| Chromium | 24 | natural | 3.64 | 1.66 | 1.83 | 3.05 |
| Manganese | 25 | 55 (natural) | -3.73 | 1.75 | 0.4 | 13.3 |
| Iron | 26 | natural | 9.45, 9.5 | 11.22 | 0.4 | 2.56, 2.6 |
| Nickel | 28 | natural | 10.3 | 13.3 | 5.2 | 4.49 |
| Copper | 29 | natural | 7.72 | 7.485 | 0.55 | 3.78 |
| Zirconium | 40 | natural | 7.16, 0.72 | 6.44 | 0.02, 0.3 | 0.18, 0.185 |
| Niobium | 41 | 93 (natural) | 7.054 | 6.253 | 0.0024 | 1.15 |
| Molybdenum | 42 | natural | 6.72 | 5.67 | 0.04 | 2.48 |
| Cadmium | 48 | natural | 4.87 | 3.04 | 3.46 | 2520 |
| Tin | 50 | natural | 6.23 | 4.87 | 0.022 | 0.626 |
| Cerium | 58 | natural | 4.8 | | 0.0 | 0.63 |
| Gadolinium | 64 | natural | 6.5 | 29.3 | 151 | 49700 |
| Tantalum | 73 | natural | 6.91 | 6.00 | 0.01 | 20.6 |
| Tungsten | 74 | natural | 4.86 | 2.97 | 1.63 | 18.3 |
| Gold | 79 | 197 (natural) | 7.60 | | | |
| Lead | 82 | natural | 9.41 | 11.115 | 0.003 | 0.171 |
| Thorium | 90 | 232 (natural) | 9.8 | | 0.00 | 7.4 |
| Uranium | 92 | natural | 8.42 | 8.903 | 0.00, 0.005 | 7.5, 7.57 |

More comprehensive data is available from NIST and Atominstitut of Vienna.
