= Neutron spin echo =

Neutron scattering technique

Neutron spin echo spectroscopy is an inelastic neutron scattering technique invented by Ferenc Mezei in the 1970s and developed in collaboration with John Hayter. In recognition of his work and in other areas, Mezei was awarded the first Walter Haelg Prize in 1999.

In magnetic resonance, a spin echo is the refocusing of spin magnetisation by a pulse of resonant electromagnetic radiation. The spin echo spectrometer possesses an extremely high energy resolution (roughly one part in 100000). Additionally, it measures the density-density correlation (or intermediate scattering function) F(Q, t) as a function of momentum transfer Q and time. Other neutron scattering techniques measure the dynamic structure factor S(Q, ω), which can be converted to F(Q, t) by a Fourier transform, which may be difficult in practice. For weak inelastic features S(Q,ω) is better suited, however, for (slow) relaxations the natural representation is given by F(Q, t). Because of its extraordinary high effective energy resolution compared to other neutron scattering techniques, NSE is an ideal method to observe overdamped internal dynamic modes (relaxations) and other diffusive processes in materials such as a polymer blends, alkane chains, or microemulsions.

Ribosome translating DNA is a biological machine. Such protein domain dynamics can only be seen by neutron spin echo spectroscopy

The extraordinary power of NSE spectrometry was further demonstrated recently by the direct observation of coupled internal protein dynamics in the proteins NHERF1 and Taq polymerase and the adherens junction, allowing the direct visualization of protein nanomachinery in motion. Several elementary reviews of the technique exist.

== How it works ==
Neutron spin echo animation showing the response of a beam of neutrons (red arrows) in their blue Bloch sphere as they travel through a series of magnets

Neutron spin echo is a time-of-flight technique. Concerning the neutron spins it has a strong analogy to the so-called Hahn echo, well known in the field of NMR. In both cases the loss of polarization (magnetization) due to dephasing of the spins in time is restored by an effective time reversal operation, that leads to a restitution of polarization (rephasing). In NMR the dephasing happens due to variation in the local fields at positions of the nuclei, in NSE the dephasing is due to different neutron velocities in the incoming neutron beam. The Larmor precession of the neutron spin in a preparation zone with a magnetic field before the sample encodes the individual velocities of neutrons in the beam into precession angles. Close to the sample the time reversal is effected by a so-called flipper. A symmetric decoding zone follows such that at its end the precession angle accumulated in the preparation zone is exactly compensated (provided the sample did not change the neutron velocity, i.e. elastic scattering), all spins rephase to form the "spin-echo". Ideally the full polarization is restored. This effect does not depend on the velocity/energy/wavelength of the incoming neutron. If the scattering at the sample is not elastic but changes the neutron velocity, the rephasing will become incomplete and a loss of final polarization results, which depends on the distribution of differences in the time, which the neutrons need to fly through the symmetric first (coding) and second (decoding)precession zones. The time differences occur due to a velocity change acquired by non-elastic scattering at the sample. The distribution of these time differences is proportional (in the linearization approximation which is appropriate for quasi-elastic high resolution spectroscopy) to the spectral part of the scattering function S(Q, ω). The effect on the measured beam polarization is proportional to the cos-Fourier transform of the spectral function, the intermediate scattering function F(Q, t). The time parameter depends on the neutron wavelength and the factor connecting precession angle with (reciprocal) velocity, which can e.g. be controlled by setting a certain magnetic field in the preparation and decoding zones. Scans of t may then be performed by varying the magnetic field.

All the spin manipulations are just a means to detect velocity changes of the neutron, which influence—for technical reasons—in terms of a Fourier transform of the spectral function in the measured intensity. The velocity changes of the neutrons convey the physical information which is available by using NSE, i.e.

$I(Q,t) \propto S(Q) + \int \cos (\omega t) \, S(Q,\omega)\, dt$ where $\omega \propto \Delta v$ and $t \propto B \times \lambda^3$.

B denotes the precession field strength, λ the (average) neutron wavelength and Δv the neutron velocity change upon scattering at the sample.

The main reason for using NSE is that by the above means it can reach Fourier times of up to many 100 ns, which corresponds to energy resolutions in the neV range. The closest approach to this resolution by a spectroscopic neutron instrument type, namely the backscattering spectrometer (BSS), is in the range of 0.5 to 1 μeV. The spin-echo trick allows to use an intense beam of neutrons with a wavelength distribution of 10% or more and at the same time to be sensitive to velocity changes in the range of less than 10^{−4}.

The above explanations assumes the generic NSE configuration—as first utilized by the IN11 instrument at the Institut Laue–Langevin (ILL)--. Other approaches are possible like the resonance spin echo, NRSE with concentrated a DC field and a RF field in the flippers at the end of preparation and decoding zones which then are without magnetic field (zero field). In principle these approaches are equivalent concerning the connection of the final intensity signal with the intermediate scattering function. Due to technical difficulties until now they have not reached the same level of performance than the generic (IN11) NSE types.

== What it can measure ==
In soft matter research the structure of macromolecular objects is often investigated by small angle neutron scattering, SANS. The exchange of hydrogen with deuterium in some of the molecules creates scattering contrast between even equal chemical species. The SANS diffraction pattern—if interpreted in real space—corresponds to a snapshot picture of the molecular arrangement. Neutron spin echo instruments can analyze the inelastic broadening of the SANS intensity and thereby analyze the motion of the macromolecular objects. A coarse analogy would be a photo with a certain opening time instead of the SANS like snapshot. So we can analyze the change of the arrangement of the molecules as function of time. The opening time corresponds to the Fourier time which depends on the setting of the NSE spectrometer, it is proportional to the magnetic field (integral) and to the third power of the neutron wavelength. Values up to several hundreds of nanoseconds are available. Note that the spatial resolution of the scattering experiment is in the nanometer range, which means that a time range of e.g. 100 ns corresponds to effective molecular motion velocities of 1 nm / 100 ns = 1 cm/s. This may be compared to the typical neutron velocity of 200–1000 m/s used in these types of experiments.

== Spin-incoherent scattering (from protons) ==
Many inelastic studies that use normal time-of-flight (TOF) or backscattering spectrometers rely on the huge incoherent neutron scattering cross section of protons. The scattering signal is dominated by the corresponding contribution, which represents the (average) self-correlation function (in time) of the protons.

For NSE spin incoherent scattering has the disadvantage that it flips the neutron spins during scattering with a probability of 2/3. Thus converting 2/3 of the scattering intensity into "non-polarized" background and putting a factor of −1/3 in front of the cos-Fourier integral contribution pertaining the incoherent intensity. This signal subtracts from the coherent echo signal. The result may be a complicated combination which cannot be decomposed if only NSE is employed. However, in pure cases, i.e. when there is an overwhelming intensity contribution due to protons, NSE can be used to measure their incoherent spectrum.

The intensity situation of NSE—for e.g. soft-matter samples—is the same as in small angle neutron scattering (SANS). Molecular objects with coherent scattering contrast at low momentum transfer (Q) show coherent scattering at considerably higher intensity than the incoherent background scattering. This effect weakens as Q becomes larger. For systems containing hydrogen, contrast requires the presence of some protons, which necessarily adds some amount of incoherent contribution to the scattering intensity. In addition even deuterons add a weak spin-incoherent scattering intensity. In SANS these Q-independent intensities are typically considered as background and subtracted. In NSE experiments they are present and may become a more significant admixture as Q increases.

Fully protonated samples allow successful incoherent measurements but at intensities of the order of the SANS background level. Note: This interference with the spin manipulation of the NSE technique occurs only with spin-incoherent scattering. Isotopic incoherent scattering yields a "normal" NSE signal.

== See also ==
- Biological small-angle scattering
- Larmor precession
- Neutron resonance spin echo
- NMR
- Protein domain
- Soft matter
- Spin echo
