= Neutron reflectometry =

Neutron reflectometry is a neutron diffraction technique for measuring the structure of thin films, similar to the often complementary techniques of X-ray reflectivity and ellipsometry. The technique provides valuable information over a wide variety of scientific and technological applications including chemical aggregation, polymer and surfactant adsorption, structure of thin film magnetic systems, biological membranes, etc. It has become a technique widespread at reactor and spallation sources, with a wide range of available fitting software and standardised data formats.

== History ==
Neutron reflectometery emerged as a new field in the 1980s, after the discovery of giant magnetoresistance in antiferromagnetically-coupled multilayered films.

== Technique ==
The technique involves shining a highly collimated beam of neutrons onto an extremely flat surface and measuring the intensity of reflected radiation as a function of angle or neutron wavelength. The exact shape of the reflectivity profile provides detailed information about the structure of the surface, including the thickness, density, and roughness of any thin films layered on the substrate.

Neutron reflectometry is most often made in specular reflection mode, where the angle of the incident beam is equal to the angle of the reflected beam. The reflection is usually described in terms of a momentum transfer vector, denoted $q_z$, which describes the change in momentum of a neutron after reflecting from the material. Conventionally the $z$ direction is defined to be the direction normal to the surface, and for specular reflection, the scattering vector has only a $z$-component. A typical neutron reflectometry plot displays the reflected intensity (relative to the incident beam) as a function of the scattering vector:

$$q_z = \frac{4\pi}{\lambda}\sin ( \theta )$$

where $\lambda$ is the neutron wavelength, and $\theta$ is the angle of incidence. The Abeles matrix formalism or the Parratt recursion can be used to calculate the specular signal arising from the interface.

Off-specular reflectometry gives rise to diffuse scattering and involves momentum transfer within the layer, and is used to determine lateral correlations within the layers, such as those arising from magnetic domains or in-plane correlated roughness.

The wavelength of the neutrons used for reflectivity are typically on the order of 0.2 to 1 nm (2 to 10 Å). This technique requires a neutron source, which may be either a research reactor or a spallation source (based on a particle accelerator). Like all neutron scattering techniques, neutron reflectometry is sensitive to contrast arising from different nuclei (as compared to electron density, which is measured in x-ray scattering). This allows the technique to differentiate between various isotopes of elements. Neutron reflectometry measures the neutron scattering length density (SLD) and can be used to accurately calculate material density if the atomic composition is known.

While some quantities such as the SLD and the thickness of thin films can be estimated from the total reflection edge and the angular / q width of. interference fringes, in general fitting software is needed to extract the full information including roughnesses or multiple thicknesses from a neutron reflectivity curve. An overview of fitting software can be found at:.

== Comparison to other reflectometry techniques ==
Although other reflectivity techniques (in particular optical reflectivity, x-ray reflectometry) operate using the same general principles, neutron measurements are advantageous in a few significant ways. Most notably, since the technique probes nuclear contrast, rather than electron density, it is more sensitive for measuring some elements, especially lighter elements (hydrogen, carbon, nitrogen, oxygen, etc.). Sensitivity to isotopes also allows contrast to be greatly (and selectively) enhanced for some systems of interest using isotopic substitution, and multiple experiments that differ only by isotopic substitution can be used to resolve the phase problem that is general to scattering techniques. Finally, neutrons are highly penetrating and typically non-perturbing: which allows for great flexibility in sample environments, and the use of delicate sample materials (e.g., biological specimens). By contrast x-ray exposure may damage some materials, and laser light can modify some materials (e.g. photoresists). Also, optical techniques may include ambiguity due to optical anisotropy (birefringence), which complementary neutron measurements can resolve. Dual polarisation interferometry is one optical method which provides analogous results to neutron reflectometry at comparable resolution although the underpinning mathematical model is somewhat simpler, i.e. it can only derive a thickness (or birefringence) for a uniform layer density.

Disadvantages of neutron reflectometry include the higher cost of the required infrastructure, the fact that some materials may become radioactive upon exposure to the beam, and insensitivity to the chemical state of constituent atoms. Moreover, the relatively lower flux and higher background of the technique (when compared to x-ray reflectivity) limit the maximum value of $q_z$ that can be probed (and hence the measurement resolution).
