= Scattering length =

Concept in quantum mechanics

The scattering length in quantum mechanics describes low-energy scattering. For potentials that decay faster than $1/r^3$ as $r\to \infty$, it is defined as the following low-energy limit:

$$\lim_{k\to 0} k\cot\delta(k) =- \frac{1}{a}\;,$$

where $a$ is the scattering length, $k$ is the wave number, and $\delta(k)$ is the phase shift of the outgoing spherical wave. The elastic cross section, $\sigma_e$, at low energies is determined solely by the scattering length:

$$\lim_{k\to 0} \sigma_e = 4\pi a^2\;.$$

== General concept ==
When a slow particle scatters off a short ranged scatterer (e.g. an impurity in a solid or a heavy particle) it cannot resolve the structure of the object since its de Broglie wavelength is very long. The idea is that then it should not be important what precise potential $V(r)$ one scatters off, but only how the potential looks at long length scales. The formal way to solve this problem is to do a partial wave expansion (somewhat analogous to the multipole expansion in classical electrodynamics), where one expands in the angular momentum components of the outgoing wave. At very low energy the incoming particle does not see any structure, therefore to lowest order one has only a spherical outgoing wave, called the s-wave in analogy with the atomic orbital at angular momentum quantum number l=0. At higher energies one also needs to consider p and d-wave (l=1,2) scattering and so on.

The idea of describing low energy properties in terms of a few parameters and symmetries is very powerful, and is also behind the concept of renormalization.

The concept of the scattering length can also be extended to potentials that decay slower than $1/r^3$ as $r\to \infty$. A famous example, relevant for proton-proton scattering, is the Coulomb-modified scattering length.

== Example ==
As an example on how to compute the s-wave (i.e. angular momentum $l=0$) scattering length for a given potential we look at the infinitely repulsive spherical potential well of radius $r_0$ in 3 dimensions. The radial Schrödinger equation ($l=0$) outside of the well is just the same as for a free particle:

$$-\frac{\hbar^2}{2m} u''(r)=E u(r),$$

where the hard core potential requires that the wave function $u(r)$ vanishes at $r=r_0$, $u(r_0)=0$. The solution is readily found:

$$u(r)=A \sin(k r+\delta_s)$$.

Here $k=\sqrt{2m E}/\hbar$ and $\delta_s=-k \cdot r_0$ is the s-wave phase shift (the phase difference between incoming and outgoing wave), which is fixed by the boundary condition $u(r_0)=0$; $A$ is an arbitrary normalization constant.

One can show that in general $\delta_s(k)\approx-k \cdot a_s +O(k^2)$ for small $k$ (i.e. low energy scattering). The parameter $a_s$ of dimension length is defined as the scattering length. For our potential we have therefore $a=r_0$, in other words the scattering length for a hard sphere is just the radius. (Alternatively one could say that an arbitrary potential with s-wave scattering length $a_s$ has the same low energy scattering properties as a hard sphere of radius $a_s$.) To relate the scattering length to physical observables that can be measured in a scattering experiment we need to compute the cross section $\sigma$. In scattering theory one writes the asymptotic wavefunction as (we assume there is a finite ranged scatterer at the origin and there is an incoming plane wave along the $z$-axis):

$$\psi(r,\theta)=e^{i k z}+f(\theta) \frac{e^{i k r}}{r}$$

where $f$ is the scattering amplitude. According to the probability interpretation of quantum mechanics the differential cross section is given by $d\sigma/d\Omega=|f(\theta)|^2$ (the probability per unit time to scatter into the direction $\mathbf{k}$). If we consider only s-wave scattering the differential cross section does not depend on the angle $\theta$, and the total scattering cross section is just $\sigma=4 \pi |f|^2$. The s-wave part of the wavefunction $\psi(r,\theta)$ is projected out by using the standard expansion of a plane wave in terms of spherical waves and Legendre polynomials $P_l(\cos \theta)$:

$$e^{i k z}\approx\frac{1}{2 i k r}\sum_{l=0}^{\infty}(2l+1)P_l(\cos \theta)\left[ (-1)^{l+1}e^{-i k r} + e^{i k r}\right]$$

By matching the $l=0$ component of $\psi(r,\theta)$ to the s-wave solution $\psi(r)=A \sin(k r+\delta_s)/r$ (where we normalize $A$ such that the incoming wave $e^{i k z}$ has a prefactor of unity) one has:

$$f=\frac{1}{2 i k}(e^{2 i \delta_s}-1)\approx \delta_s/k \approx -  a_s$$

This gives:

$\sigma= \frac{4 \pi}{k^2} \sin^2 \delta_s =4 \pi a_s^2$

== See also ==
- Fermi pseudopotential
- Neutron scattering length
