= Neutron triple-axis spectrometry =

Triple-axis spectrometry (TAS, three axis spectroscopy) is a technique used in conjunction with inelastic neutron scattering. The instrument is referred to as triple-axis spectrometer (also called TAS). It allows measurement of the scattering function at any point in energy and momentum space physically accessible by the spectrometer.

== History ==
The triple-axis spectrometry method was first developed by Bertram Brockhouse at the National Research Experimental NRX reactor at the Chalk River Laboratories in Canada. The first results from the prototype triple-axis spectrometer were published in January 1955 and the first true triple-axis spectrometer was built in 1956. Bertram Brockhouse shared the 1994 Nobel Prize for Physics for this development, which allowed elementary excitations, such as phonons and magnons, to be observed directly. The Nobel citation was "for pioneering contributions to the development of neutron scattering techniques for studies of condensed matter" and "for the development of neutron spectroscopy".

== TAS instruments in current use ==
=== FRM-II Forschungsneutronenquelle Heinz Maier-Leibnitz ===
- PANDA – a cold neutron triple-axis spectrometer.
- PUMA – a thermal neutron triple-axis spectrometer with multianalyser-detector option.
- TRISP – a thermal neutron triple-axis spin echo spectrometer.
- KOMPASS – a cold triple-axis spectrometer with polarization analysis
- MIRA – a cold triple-axis spectrometer

=== Helmholtz-Zentrum Berlin für Materialien und Energie ===
- FLEX – a cold neutron triple-axis spectrometer with optional neutron resonance spin echo mode.
- E1 – a thermal neutron triple-axis spectrometer with polarization analysis.

=== Paul Scherrer Institut ===
- RITA-II – a cold-neutron triple-axis spectrometer.
- TASP – a cold-neutron triple-axis spectrometer with polarization analysis and neutron spherical polarimetry.
- EIGER – a thermal-neutron triple-axis spectrometer.

=== Institut Laue-Langevin ===
- IN1 – a hot-neutron triple-axis spectrometer.
- IN3 – a thermal-neutron triple-axis spectrometer for tests.
- IN8 – a high-flux thermal-neutron triple-axis spectrometer.
- IN12 – a cold neutron triple-axis spectrometer.
- IN14 – a cold-neutron triple-axis spectrometer with polarized neutron capability.
- IN20 – a thermal-neutron triple-axis spectrometer with polarized neutron capability.
- IN22 – a thermal-neutron triple-axis spectrometer with polarized neutron capability.
- D10 – a thermal-neutron four-circle diffractometer with a triple-axis energy analysis option.

=== CEA/Saclay Laboratoire Léon Brillouin ===
- 1T-1 – a double-focusing thermal neutron triple-axis spectrometer.
- 2T-1 – a thermal-neutron triple-axis spectrometer.
- 4F-1 – a cold-neutron triple-axis spectrometer.
- 4F-2 – a cold-neutron triple-axis spectrometer.

=== NIST Center for Neutron Research ===
- SPINS – a cold-neutron triple-axis spectrometer with polarized neutron capability.
- BT-7 – a thermal-neutron triple-axis spectrometer with polarized neutron capability.
- MACS – a high-flux cold-neutron multi-axis spectrometer.

=== ORNL HFIR ===
- CTAX – a cold-neutron triple-axis spectrometer.
- PTAX(HB1) – a thermal-neutron triple-axis spectrometer specifically designed for polarized neutron measurements.
- FIETAX (HB1A) – a fixed incident energy thermal-neutron triple-axis spectrometer.
- TAX (HB3) – a high-flux thermal-neutron triple-axis spectrometer.

=== ANSTO Bragg Institute ===
- TAIPAN – a thermal-neutron triple-axis spectrometer with polarized neutron capability and beryllium-filter option.
- SIKA – a cold-neutron triple-axis spectrometer with polarized neutron capability.

=== MURR University of Missouri Research Reactor ===
- Triax – a thermal-neutron triple-axis spectrometer.
