= Brandt F. Eichman =

American structural biologist

Brandt F. Eichman is an American structural biologist and biochemist. He is Professor of Biological Sciences and Professor of Biochemistry at Vanderbilt University, where he holds the William R. Kenan, Jr. Chair. His research focuses on the structural biology of DNA repair and DNA replication, particularly the molecular mechanisms by which protein–DNA complexes preserve genome stability.

== Education ==
Eichman received a Bachelor of Science in Chemistry, with a minor in Biology, from the University of Mississippi. He earned a Ph.D. in Biochemistry and Biophysics from Oregon State University, where he studied DNA structure using X-ray crystallography in the laboratory of P. Shing Ho. He subsequently completed postdoctoral research as a National Institutes of Health fellow at Harvard Medical School in the laboratory of Tom Ellenberger, investigating the structural biology of DNA repair and DNA replication proteins.

== Career ==
Eichman joined the Vanderbilt University faculty in 2004 as an assistant professor. He was promoted to associate professor in 2010 and professor in 2016. From 2019 to 2025 he served as chair of Vanderbilt's Department of Biological Sciences. He is affiliated with the Vanderbilt Center for Structural Biology, the Vanderbilt Institute of Chemical Biology, and the Vanderbilt-Ingram Cancer Center.

== Research ==
Eichman's research examines the molecular mechanisms that maintain genome stability through DNA repair and DNA replication. His laboratory combines cryogenic electron microscopy, X-ray crystallography, and biochemical approaches to determine the structures of protein–DNA complexes involved in repairing damaged DNA and restarting stalled replication forks. His work has contributed to understanding the structural basis of DNA glycosylases involved in base excision repair, mechanisms of replication fork remodeling, and the repair of DNA interstrand crosslinks. An independent profile published by the SBGrid Consortium highlighted his laboratory's discovery that the DNA glycosylase AlkD repairs bulky DNA lesions through a non-base-flipping mechanism.

== Honors and recognition ==
Among Eichman's honors are:

- Sigma Xi Young Investigator Award (2009)
- William R. Kenan, Jr. Chair, Vanderbilt University (2018)
- Biochemical Society International Award (2021), recognizing outstanding and independent research in the molecular biosciences.
- Elected Fellow of the American Association for the Advancement of Science (2022) for contributions to structural cell biology and DNA repair research.

== Selected publications ==
- Eichman, Brandt F.; Vargason, Jeffrey M.; Mooers, Blaine H. M.; Ho, P. Shing (2000). "The Holliday junction in an inverted repeat DNA sequence: Sequence effects on the structure of four-way junctions". Proceedings of the National Academy of Sciences of the United States of America. 97 (8): 3971–3976. doi:10.1073/pnas.97.8.3971. PMC 18126. PMID 10760268.
- Warren, Eric M.; Vaithiyalingam, Sivaraja; Haworth, Justin; Greer, Briana; Bielinsky, Anja-Katrin; Chazin, Walter J.; Eichman, Brandt F. (2008). "Structural Basis for DNA Binding by Replication Initiator Mcm10". Structure. 16 (12): 1892–1901. doi:10.1016/j.str.2008.10.005. PMC 2636851. PMID 19081065.
- Bétous, Rémy; Mason, Aaron C.; Rambo, Robert P.; Bansbach, Carol E.; Badu-Nkansah, Akosua; Sirbu, Bianca M.; Eichman, Brandt F.; Cortez, David (2012). "SMARCAL1 catalyzes fork regression and Holliday junction migration to maintain genome stability during DNA replication". Genes & Development. 26 (2): 151–162. doi:10.1101/gad.178459.111. PMC 3273839. PMID 22279047.
- Mullins, Elwood A.; Shi, Rongxin; Parsons, Zachary D.; Yuen, Philip K.; David, Sheila S.; Igarashi, Yasuhiro; Eichman, Brandt F. (2015). "The DNA glycosylase AlkD uses a non-base-flipping mechanism to excise bulky lesions". Nature. 527 (7577): 254–258. doi:10.1038/nature15728. PMC 4896645.
- Mullins, Elwood A.; Salay, Lauren E.; Durie, Clarissa L.; Bradley, Noah P.; Jackman, Jane E.; Ohi, Melanie D.; Chazin, Walter J.; Eichman, Brandt F. (2024). "A mechanistic model of primer synthesis from catalytic structures of DNA polymerase α–primase". Nature Structural & Molecular Biology. 31 (5): 777–790. doi:10.1038/s41594-024-01227-4. PMC 11102853. PMID 38491139.
