= Xenocs =

Scientific instrumentation company in Grenoble

Xenocs is a scientific instrumentation company based in Grenoble, France, providing instruments, software and related services for x-ray characterization of materials, in particular Small Angle X-ray Scattering (SAXS) and Wide Angle X-ray Scattering (WAXS).

Xenocs systems are utilized by academic institutions, public research laboratories, and industrial R&D centers for nanoscale characterization and the development of advanced materials. Application segments range from nanomaterials, polymers, food, consumer care, and energy storage to biomaterials and pharmaceuticals.

As of September 2020, the Xenocs group reported 75 employees.

== History ==
Xenocs was founded in 2000 as a spin-off from Institut Laue Langevin in Grenoble, France, by Ian Anderson, Frédéric Bossan and Peter Høghøj, with the latter two forming the management team.

In 2001 the company moved to nearby Sassenage and set up facilities for production of X-ray, EUV and neutron optics. In 2002 it launched the FOX2D line of single reflection multilayer coated x-ray optics, followed in 2006 by the GeniX micro-focus x-ray source and the FOX3D aspheric multilayer coated x-ray optics building on a range of patents. In 2008 it launched products for (virtually) scatterless x-ray collimation, allowing for increased performance of SAXS equipment, leading to the launch of the Xeuss SAXS instrument product-line in 2010.

In 2014, Xenocs launched the Nano-inXider compact SAXS equipment at the IUCr conference in collaboration with CEA and Arkema. The same year was also the International Year of Crystallography and Xenocs co-organized the IUCr-UNESCO Open Factory held in December.

In January 2017, Xenocs expanded its international operations by acquiring SAXSLAB, a manufacturer of high-end SAXS laboratory equipment with offices near Copenhagen, Denmark, and Amherst, Massachusetts, USA. Following the acquisition, SAXSLAB's product lines and regional entities were integrated into the parent company.

In 2019, Xenocs relocated its global headquarters and R&D facilities from Sassenage to a newly constructed 4,800-square-meter facility in the scientific polygon of Grenoble, France. The same year, the company utilized the combined expertise of both product lines to develop and launch the Xeuss 3.0 SAXS/WAXS beamline system alongside the Xenocs XSACT software for data reduction and analysis.

In 2024, the company expanded its instrumentation and software portfolio with the simultaneous launch of the Xeuss Pro SAXS/WAXS system and the Xenocs XSACT Pro data reduction and analysis software. In September 2024, Xenocs announced a global strategic cooperation with the Japanese analytical instrumentation manufacturer Rigaku Corporation. This partnership established a cross-selling agreement where Rigaku distributes Xenocs products in Japan, while Xenocs integrates Rigaku's rotating anode X-ray generators into its worldwide instrument portfolio.
