= Structural biology =

Study of molecular structures in biology

Structure of nucleoprotein MA: The 50S ribosomal subunit from H. marismortui X-ray crystallographic model of 29 of the 33 native components, from the laboratory of Thomas Steitz. Of the 31 component proteins, 27 are shown (blue), along with its 2 RNA strands (orange/yellow). Scale: assembly is approx. 24 nm across.

Structural biology is concerned with the structural analysis of biological material at every level of organization.

During the 19th and early 20th centuries, structural studies were largely limited to structures visible to the naked eye or through magnifying glasses and light microscopes. In the 20th century, a variety of experimental techniques were developed to examine the 3D structures of biological molecules. The most prominent techniques are X-ray crystallography, nuclear magnetic resonance, and electron microscopy. The discovery of X-rays and their application to protein crystals transformed structural biology by allowing researchers to determine the three-dimensional structures of biological molecules in atomic detail. Likewise, NMR spectroscopy allowed information about protein structure and dynamics to be obtained. Finally, in the 21st century, electron microscopy also saw a drastic revolution with the development of more coherent electron sources, aberration correction for electron microscopes, and reconstruction software that enabled the successful implementation of high resolution cryo-electron microscopy, thereby permitting the study of individual proteins and molecular complexes in three-dimensions at angstrom resolution.

With the development of these three techniques, the field of structural biology expanded and also became a branch of molecular biology, biochemistry, and biophysics concerned with the molecular structure of biological macromolecules (especially proteins, made up of amino acids, RNA or DNA, made up of nucleotides, and membranes, made up of lipids), how they acquire the structures they have, and how alterations in their structures affect their function. This subject is of great interest to biologists because macromolecules carry out most of the functions of cells, and it is only by coiling into specific three-dimensional shapes that they are able to perform these functions. This architecture, the "tertiary structure" of molecules, depends in a complicated way on each molecule's basic composition, or "primary structure." At lower resolutions, tools such as FIB-SEM tomography have allowed for greater understanding of cells and their organelles in 3-dimensions, and how each hierarchical level of various extracellular matrices contributes to function (for example in bone). Computational methods can also predict molecular structures with high accuracy, complementing the experimental study of biological structures. Computational techniques such as molecular dynamics simulations can be used in conjunction with empirical structure determination strategies to extend and study protein structure, conformation and function.

Hemoglobin, the oxygen transporting protein found in red blood cells

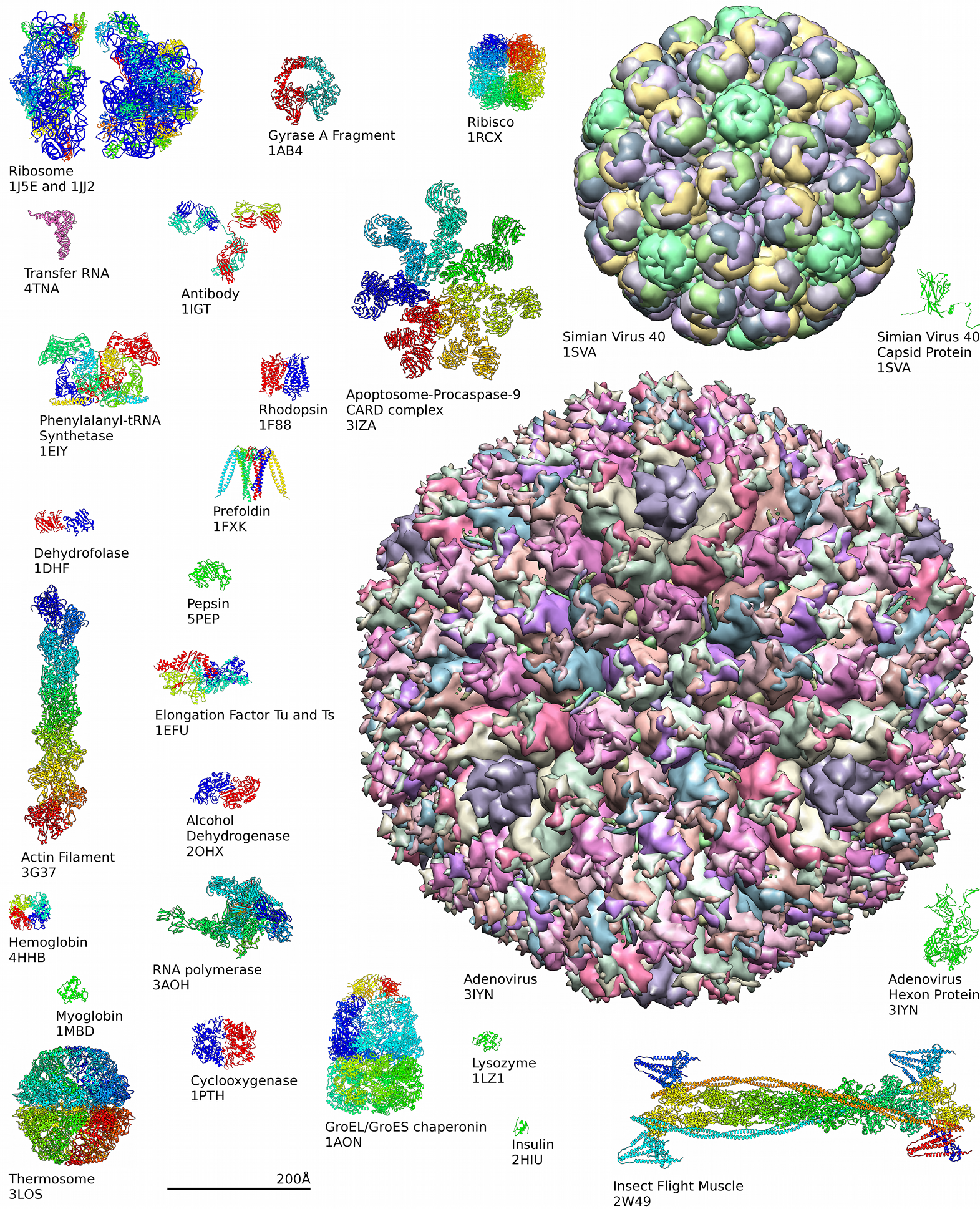
Examples of protein structures from the Protein Data Bank (PDB)

== History ==
In 1912 Max Von Laue directed X-rays at crystallized copper sulfate generating a diffraction pattern. These experiments led to the development of X-ray crystallography, and its usage in exploring biological structures. In 1951, Rosalind Franklin and Maurice Wilkins used X-ray diffraction patterns to capture the first image of deoxyribonucleic acid (DNA). Francis Crick and James Watson modeled the double helical structure of DNA using this same technique in 1953 and received the Nobel Prize in Medicine along with Wilkins in 1962.

Pepsin crystals were the first proteins to be crystallized for use in X-ray diffraction, by Theodore Svedberg who received the 1962 Nobel Prize in Chemistry. The first tertiary protein structure, that of myoglobin, was published in 1958 by John Kendrew. During this time, modeling of protein structures was done using balsa wood or wire models. With the invention of modeling software such as CCP4 in the late 1970s, modeling is now done with computer assistance. Recent developments in the field have included the generation of X-ray free electron lasers, allowing analysis of the dynamics and motion of biological molecules, and the use of structural biology in assisting synthetic biology.

In the late 1930s and early 1940s, the combination of work done by Isidor Rabi, Felix Bloch, and Edward Mills Purcell led to the development of nuclear magnetic resonance (NMR). Currently, solid-state NMR is widely used in the field of structural biology to determine the structure and dynamic nature of proteins (protein NMR).

In 1990, Richard Henderson and colleagues determined a high-resolution three-dimensional structure of bacteriorhodopsin using electron cryomicroscopy. Subsequent advances in electron detectors, image processing and three-dimensional reconstruction established cryo-electron microscopy (cryo-EM) as a major method for determining high-resolution structures of biological macromolecules.

More recently, computational methods have been developed to model and study biological structures. For example, molecular dynamics (MD) is commonly used to analyze the dynamic movements of biological molecules. In 1975, the first simulation of a biological folding process using MD was published in Nature. Recently, protein structure prediction was significantly improved by a new machine learning method called AlphaFold. Some claim that computational approaches are starting to lead the field of structural biology research.

== Techniques ==
Biomolecules are too small to see in detail even with the most advanced light microscopes. The methods that structural biologists use to determine their structures generally involve measurements on vast numbers of identical molecules at the same time. These methods include:

- Mass spectrometry
- Macromolecular crystallography
- Neutron diffraction
- Proteolysis
- Nuclear magnetic resonance spectroscopy of proteins (NMR)
- Electron paramagnetic resonance (EPR)
- Cryogenic electron microscopy (cryoEM)
- Electron crystallography and microcrystal electron diffraction
- Multiangle light scattering
- Small angle scattering
- Ultrafast laser spectroscopy
- Anisotropic terahertz microspectroscopy
- Two-dimensional infrared spectroscopy
- Dual-polarization interferometry and circular dichroism

Most often researchers use them to study the "native states" of macromolecules. But variations on these methods are also used to watch nascent or denatured molecules assume or reassume their native states. See protein folding.

A third approach that structural biologists take to understanding structure is bioinformatics to look for patterns among the diverse sequences that give rise to particular shapes. Researchers often can deduce aspects of the structure of integral membrane proteins based on the membrane topology predicted by hydrophobicity analysis. See protein structure prediction.

== Applications ==
Structural biologists have made significant contributions towards understanding the molecular components and mechanisms underlying human diseases. For example, cryo-EM and ssNMR have been used to study the aggregation of amyloid fibrils, which are associated with Alzheimer's disease, Parkinson's disease, and type II diabetes. In addition to amyloid proteins, scientists have used cryo-EM to produce high resolution models of tau filaments in the brain of Alzheimer's patients which may help develop better treatments in the future. Structural biology tools can also be used to explain interactions between pathogens and hosts. For example, structural biology tools have enabled virologists to understand how the HIV envelope allows the virus to evade human immune responses.

Structural biology is also an important component of drug discovery. Scientists can identify targets using genomics, study those targets using structural biology, and develop drugs that are suited for those targets. Specifically, ligand-NMR, mass spectrometry, and X-ray crystallography are commonly used techniques in the drug discovery process. For example, researchers have used structural biology to better understand Met, a protein encoded by a protooncogene that is an important drug target in cancer. Similar research has been conducted for HIV targets to treat people with AIDS. Researchers are also developing new antimicrobials for mycobacterial infections using structure-driven drug discovery.

== Macromolecular assembly ==
Selected biological assemblies
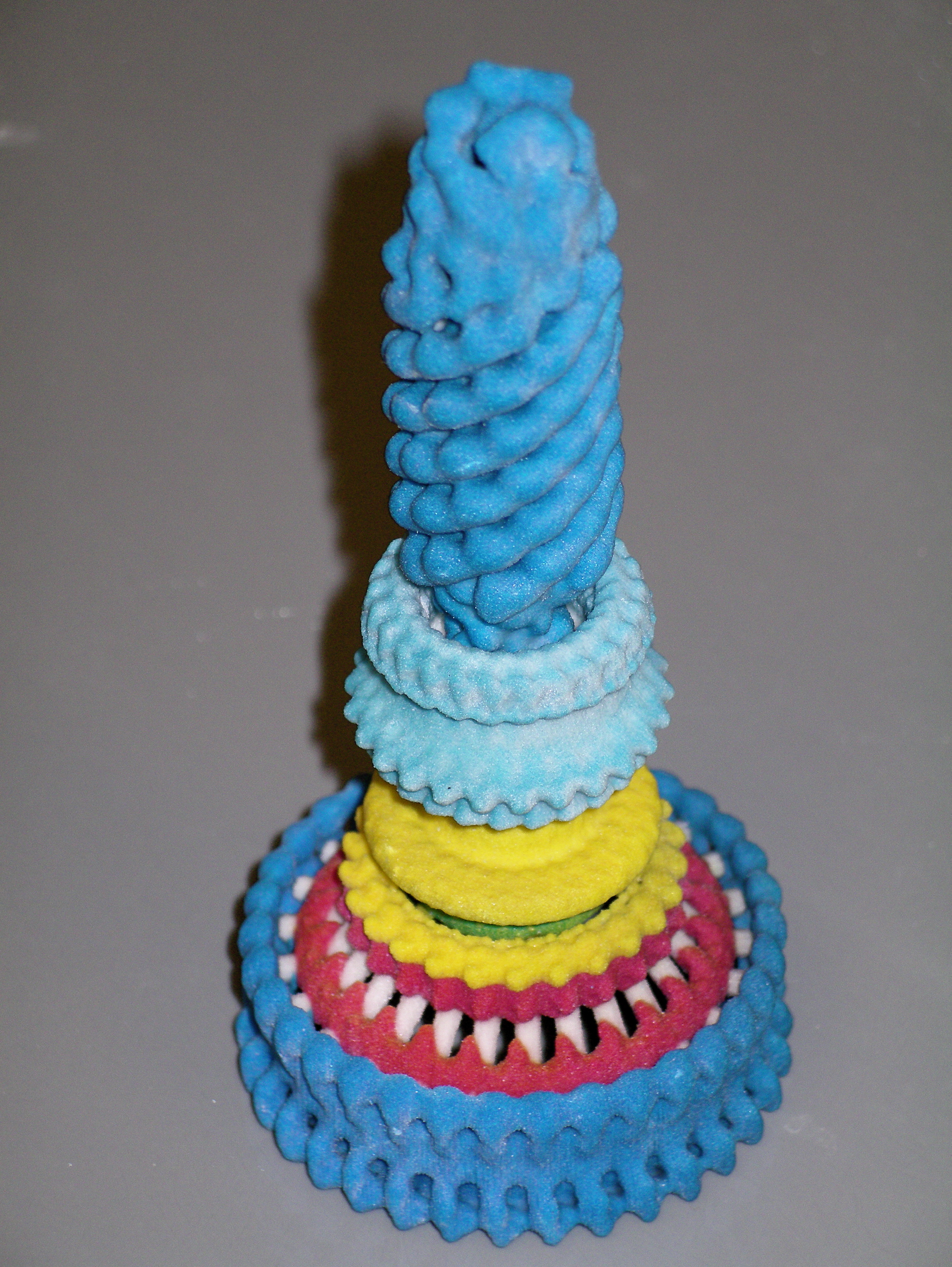
3D printed model of the structure of a bacterial flagellum "motor" and partial rod structure of a Salmonella species. Bottom to top: dark blue, repeating FliM and FliN, motor/switch proteins; red, FliG motor/switch proteins; yellow, FliF transmembrane coupling proteins; light blue, L and P ring proteins; and (at top), dark blue, the cap, hook-filament junction, hook, and rod proteins.

A eukaryotic ribosome, which catalytically translate the information content contained in mRNA molecules into proteins. The animation presents the elongation and membrane targeting stages of eukaryotic translation, showing the mRNA as a black arc, the ribosome subunits in green and yellow, tRNAs in dark blue, proteins such as elongation and other factors involved in light blue, the growing polypeptide chain as a black thread growing vertically from the curve of the mRNA. At end of the animation, the polypeptide produced is extruded through a light blue SecY pore into the gray interior of the ER

Cross-sections of phospholipid (PLs) relevant to biomembrane MAs. Yellow-orange indicates hydrophobic lipid tails; black and white spheres represent PL polar regions (v.i.). Bilayer/liposome dimensions (obscured in graphic): hydrophobic and polar regions, each ~30 Å (3.0 nm) "thick"—the polar from ~15 Å (1.5 nm) on each side.

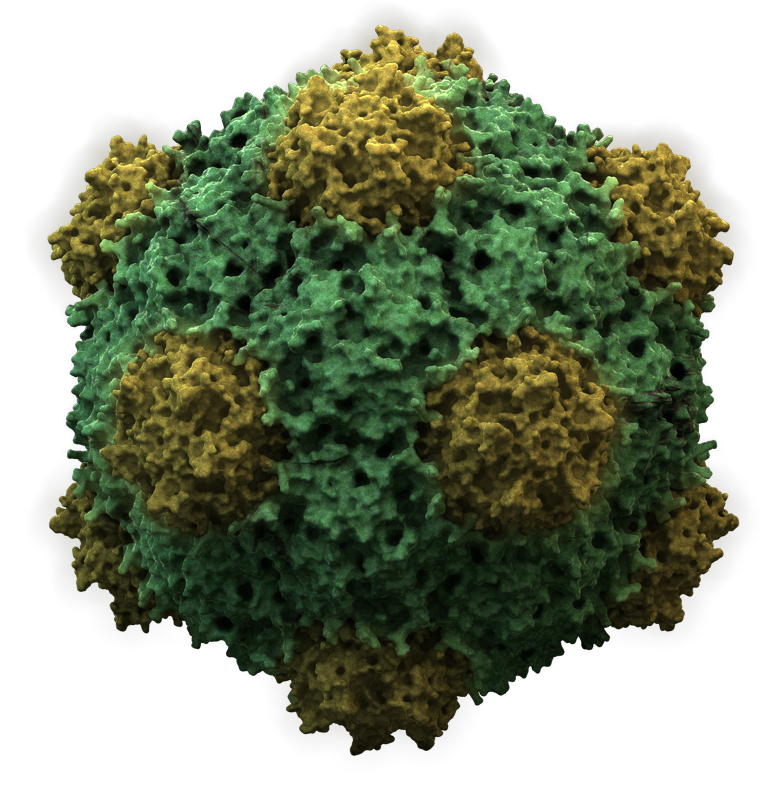
A graphical representation of the structure of a viral MA, cowpea mosaic virus, with 30 copies of each of its coat proteins, the small coat protein (S, yellow) and the large coat protein (L, green), which, along with 2 molecules of positive-sense RNA (RNA-1 and RNA-2, not visible) constitute the virion. The assembly is highly symmetric, and is ~280 Å (28 nm) across at its widest point.

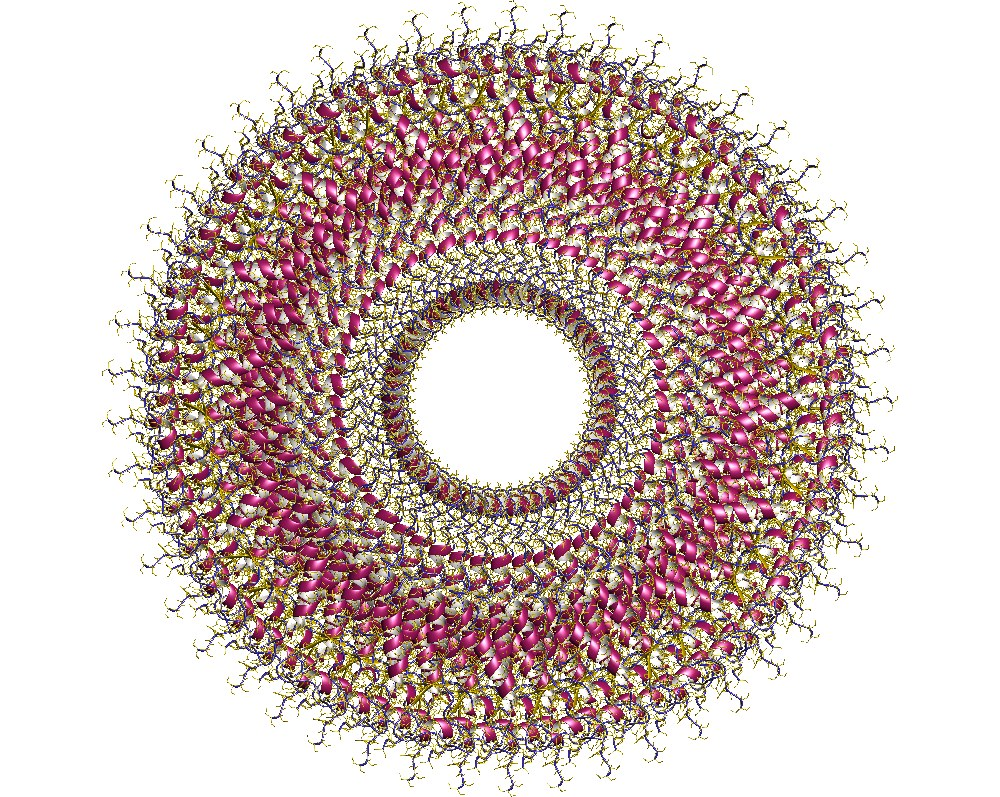
tobacco mosaic virus protein coat; virus protein coats known as capsids are examples of macromolecular cages in nature. The protein shell encapsulates a hollow chamber which contains the viral genomic information.

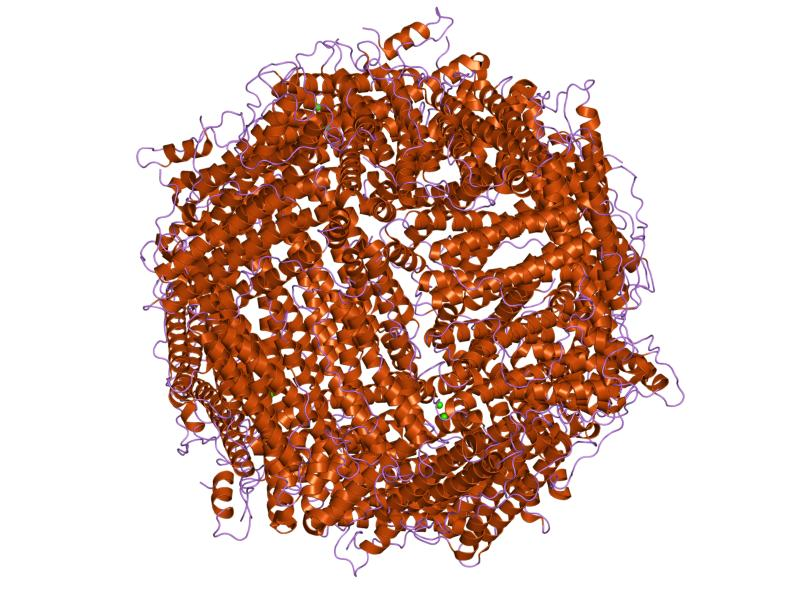
Ferritin is a hollow sphere that has an outer diameter close to 12 nm and an inner diameter of 7-8 nm. The inner chamber of ferritin uptakes or binds iron in its ferrous state and stores iron in its ferric or trivalent state.

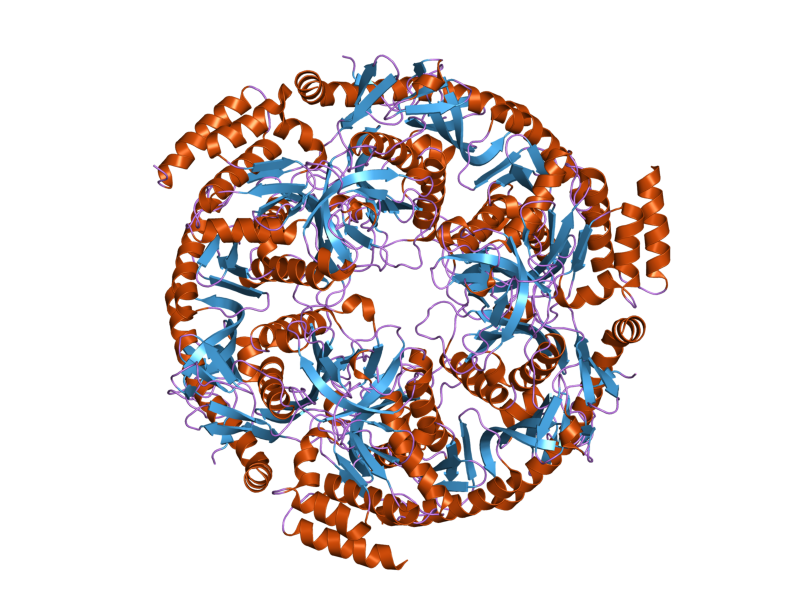
The RNA exosome is a biomolecular cage that has nuclease activity which catalyzes the breakdown of RNA molecules. Shown is the whole RNA exosome with a helical protein framework and a central chamber where RNA degradation occurs.

Structural biology overlaps with the concept of macromolecular assembly, which refers to massive chemical structures such as viruses, cellular organelles and membranes, and ribosomes, etc. Many are multicomponent, being comprise of polypeptide, polynucleotide, polysaccharide, and or other polymeric macromolecules.

=== Biomolecular complex ===
A biomolecular complex, also called a biomacromolecular complex, is any biological complex made of more than one biopolymer (protein, RNA, DNA, carbohydrate) or large non-polymeric biomolecules (lipid). The interactions between these biomolecules are non-covalent. Examples:

- Protein complexes, some of which are multienzyme complexes: proteasome, DNA polymerase III holoenzyme, RNA polymerase II holoenzyme, symmetric viral capsids, chaperonin complex GroEL-GroES, photosystem I, ATP synthase, ferritin.
- RNA-protein complexes: ribosome, spliceosome, vault, SnRNP. Such complexes in cell nucleus are called ribonucleoproteins (RNPs).
- DNA-protein complexes: nucleosome.
- Protein-lipid complexes: lipoprotein.

The biomacromolecular complexes are studied structurally by X-ray crystallography, NMR spectroscopy of proteins, cryo-electron microscopy and successive single particle analysis, and electron tomography. The atomic structure models obtained by X-ray crystallography and biomolecular NMR spectroscopy can be docked into the much larger structures of biomolecular complexes obtained by lower resolution techniques like electron microscopy, electron tomography, and small-angle X-ray scattering.

Complexes of macromolecules occur ubiquitously in nature, where they are involved in the construction of viruses and all living cells. In addition, they play fundamental roles in all basic life processes (protein translation, cell division, vesicle trafficking, intra- and inter-cellular exchange of material between compartments, etc.). In each of these roles, complex mixtures of become organized in specific structural and spatial ways. While the individual macromolecules are held together by a combination of covalent bonds and intramolecular non-covalent forces (i.e., associations between parts within each molecule, via charge-charge interactions, van der Waals forces, and dipole–dipole interactions such as hydrogen bonds), by definition MAs themselves are held together solely via the noncovalent forces, except now exerted between molecules (i.e., intermolecular interactions).

== Cages ==
=== Protein cages ===
The term protein cage delineates a diverse range of protein structures that are formed by the self-assembly of protein subunits into hollow macromolecular nanoparticles. These protein cages are nanoparticles that have one or more cavities present in their structure. The size of the cavity contributes to the size of the particle that the cavity can enclose, for example inorganic nanoparticles, nucleic acids, and even other proteins. The interior or chamber portion of the protein cage is usually accessible through a pore which is located in between protein subunits. The RNA exosome has nuclease active sites that are present in a cavity where 3' RNA degradation takes place; access to this cavity is controlled by a pore and this serves to prevent uncontrollable RNA decay. Some protein cages are dynamic structures that assemble and disassemble in response to external stimuli. Other examples of protein cages are clathrin cages, viral envelopes, chaperonins, and the iron storage protein ferritin.

=== Genetically engineered cages ===
Macromolecular cages can also be formed synthetically using biomolecules. Protein cages can be genetically engineered, and the outside of the cage can be tailored with synthetic polymers, which is known as protein-polymer conjugation. Preformed polymer chains can be attached to the surface of the protein using chemical linkers. Polymerization can also occur from the protein surface, and the polymer can also be bound to the surface of protein cages via electrostatic interactions. The purpose of this modification is to make synthetic protein cages more biocompatible; this post synthetic modification makes the protein cage less susceptible to an immune response and stabilizes the cage from degradation from proteases. Virus-like protein (VLP) cages have also been synthesized and recombinant DNA technology is used to form non-native virus-like proteins. The first reported case of the formation of non-native VLP constructs into a capsid-like structure utilized a functionalized gold core for nucleation. The self-assembly of the VLP was initiated by the electrostatic interaction of the functionalized gold nanoparticles which is similar to the interaction of a native virus with its nucleic acid component. These viral protein cages have potential applications in biosensing and medical imaging. DNA origami is another strategy to form macromolecular cages or containers. In one case, a 3D macromolecular cage with icosahedral symmetry (resembling viral capsids) was formed based on the synthetic strategy in 2D origami. The structure had an inside volume or hollow cavity encased by triangular faces, similar to a pyramid. This close-faced cage was designed to potentially encapsulate other materials such as proteins and metal nanoparticles.===Virus assembly=== During assembly of the bacteriophage (phage) T4 virion, the morphogenetic proteins encoded by the phage genes interact with each other in a characteristic sequence. Maintaining an appropriate balance in the amounts of each of these proteins produced during viral infection appears to be critical for normal phage T4 morphogenesis. Phage T4 encoded proteins that determine virion structure include major structural components, minor structural components and non-structural proteins that catalyze specific steps in the morphogenesis sequence

== See also ==
- Primary structure
- Secondary structure
- Tertiary structure
- Quaternary structure
- Structural domain
- Structural motif
- Protein subunit
- Molecular model
- Cooperativity
- Chaperonin
- Structural genomics
- Stereochemistry
- Resolution (electron density)
- Proteopedia The collaborative, 3D encyclopedia of proteins and other molecules.
- Protein structure prediction
- SBGrid Consortium
- Spatial biology
