= FXS =

FXS may refer to:

- Fluctuation X-ray scattering, scientific technique
- Foreign exchange station, telephone terminology
- Fragile X syndrome, genetic disorder
- Toyota FXS, concept vehicle
- FXS station callsign
  - KFXS radio station
  - WFXS-DT TV station

== See also ==
- FX (disambiguation)
