= Alexandra Slawin =

British chemist and academic

Alexandra Martha Zoya Slawin
- Born: 1961 (age 64–65)
- Education: Loughborough University; Imperial College London
- Scientific career
- Workplaces: University of St Andrews
- Thesis: The X-ray crystal structures of organic and inorganic systems (1997)

Alexandra Martha Zoya Slawin (born 1961) is a British chemist and professor at the University of St Andrews. Her research looks to understand the structure of supramolecular systems (e.g. rotaxanes and catenanes). She is generally considered as one of the world's leading crystallographers. She was elected Fellow of the Royal Society of Edinburgh in 2011.

== Early life and education ==
Slawin studied chemistry at Imperial College London. After earning her bachelor's degree she worked at Imperial as an Experimental Officer on X-ray crystallography. She moved to the Loughborough University, where she completed a PhD on the crystal structures of organic and inorganic systems. She demonstrated how useful single cyrstal X-ray measurements were to better understand the structures of organic and inorganic solid-state systems. Toward the end of her thesis she started to focus on supramolecular chemistry, particularly macrocycles, rotaxanes and catenanes.

== Research and career ==
Slawin joined the University of St Andrews in 1999. She was made a professor in 2004, and serves as the director of the Molecular Structure Lab. Her lab have sophisticated fully automated instrumentation for X-Ray Diffraction, including two rotating anodes and sensitive detectors. She called the system the Standard (St Andrews Automated Robotic Diffractometer), which she commercialised with Rigaku.

Slawin is one of the most frequent contributors to the Cambridge Crystallographic Database, having submitted over 3,500 entries. Slawin was elected Fellow of the Royal Society of Edinburgh in 2011. The Royal Society of Chemistry named her one of their Golden Authors in 2021.

== Select publications ==
- Zhuojia Lin; Alexandra Martha Zoya Slawin; Russell Morris (2007). "Chiral induction in the ionothermal synthesis of a 3-D coordination polymer". Journal of the American Chemical Society. 129 (16): 4880–4881. Bibcode:2007JAChS.129.4880L. doi:10.1021/ja070671y. ISSN 0002-7863. OCLC 123864586. PMID 17394325. Wikidata Q34613668.
- Pier Lucio Anelli; Peter R. Ashton; Roberto Ballardini; et al. (January 1992). "Molecular meccano. 1. [2]Rotaxanes and a [2]catenane made to order". Journal of the American Chemical Society. 114 (1): 193–218. doi:10.1021/ja00027a027. ISSN 0002-7863. Wikidata Q56551235.
- Ross S Forgan; Ronald A Smaldone; Jeremiah J Gassensmith; et al. (20 December 2011). "Nanoporous carbohydrate metal-organic frameworks". Journal of the American Chemical Society. 134 (1): 406–417. doi:10.1021/ja208224f. ISSN 0002-7863. PMID 22092094. Wikidata Q38330220.
