= Grazing-incidence small-angle scattering =

Grazing-incidence small-angle scattering (GISAS) is a diffraction technique used to study nanostructured surfaces and thin films. The scattered probe is either photons (grazing-incidence small-angle X-ray scattering, GISAXS) or neutrons (grazing-incidence small-angle neutron scattering, GISANS). GISAS combines the accessible length scales of small-angle scattering (SAS: SAXS or SANS) and the surface sensitivity of grazing incidence diffraction (GID).

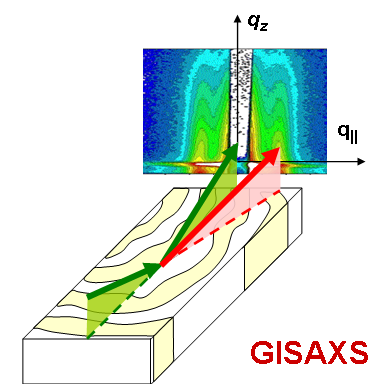
Geometry of a GISAS experiment. The incident beam strikes the sample under a small angle close to the critical angle of total external x-ray reflection. The intense reflected beam as well as the intense scattering in the incident plane are attenuated by a rod-shaped beam stop. The diffuse scattering from the sample (red arrow) is recorded with an area detector. As an example the scattering from a block copolymer film with perpendicular lamellae is shown in the detector plane. The two lobes of scattering correspond to the lateral lamellar period of about 80 nm.

== Applications ==
A typical application of GISAS is the characterisation of self-assembly and self-organization on the nanoscale in thin films. Systems studied by GISAS include quantum dot arrays, growth instabilities formed during in-situ growth, self-organized nanostructures in thin films of block copolymers, silica mesophases, and nanoparticles.

GISAXS was introduced by Levine and Cohen to study the dewetting of gold deposited on a glass surface. The technique was further developed by Naudon and coworkers to study metal agglomerates on surfaces and in buried interfaces. With the advent of nanoscience other applications evolved quickly, first in hard matter such as the characterization of quantum dots on semiconductor surfaces and the in-situ characterization of metal deposits on oxide surfaces. This was soon to be followed by soft matter systems such as ultrathin polymer films, polymer blends, block copolymer films and other self-organized nanostructured thin films that have become indispensable for nanoscience and technology. Future challenges of GISAS may lie in biological applications, such as proteins, peptides, or viruses attached to surfaces or in lipid layers.

== Interpretation ==
GISAS is more complicated than most other scattering techniques because a beam that impinges under a small grazing angle on a stratified sample is partly refracted, partly reflected by interfaces between material layers with different scattering-length density. In consequence, the incident wave field cannot be approximated as plane waves. Rather, it is a linear superposition of two plane waves, representing the transmitted and reflected beam. Per reciprocity, the same holds true for the scattered wave travelling towards a specific detector pixel.

The four terms of the DWBA scattering amplitude

Refraction and reflection can be computed according to the Fresnel equations, just as in specular reflectometry. Scattering from inhomogeneities is determined by the same structure factors and form factors as in conventional small-angle scattering (SAS). The standard scattering theory, first-order Born approximation must be extended to include two incident and two outgoing plane waves. This is the essence of the distorted wave Born approximation (DWBA) with its four scattering terms. (Note: In most of the experimental literature, references do not reach back beyond Sinha et al 1988. However, the four DWBA terms have been worked out for specific sample much earlier [S. Kishino and K. Kohra, Jpn. J. Appl. Phys. 10, 551 (1971); S. Kishino, R. Noda, and K. Kohra, J. Phys. Soc. Jpn. 33, 158 (1972); P. Mazur and D. L. Mills, Phys. Rev. B 26, 5175 (1982)]], and they appear in full genericity in Dietrich and Wagner 1984, and in more readable form in their neutron paper from 1985. Another frequently cited work [G. H. Vineyard, Phys. Rev. B 26, 4146 (1982)] considers reflection only for the incoming, not for the scattered wave, and therefore arrives at two instead of four DWBA terms.)

However, while diffuse reflectivity remains confined to the incident plane (the plane given by the incident beam and the surface normal), GISAS explores the whole scattering from the surface in all directions, typically utilizing an area detector. Thus GISAS gains access to a wider range of lateral and vertical structures and, in particular, is sensitive to the morphology and preferential alignment of nanoscale objects at the surface or inside the thin film.

In the interpretation of GISAS images some complication arises in the scattering from low-Z films e.g. organic materials on silicon wafers, when the incident angle is in between the critical angles of the film and the substrate. In this case, the reflected beam from the substrate has a similar strength as the incident beam and thus the scattering from the reflected beam from the film structure can give rise to a doubling of scattering features in the perpendicular direction. This as well as interference between the scattering from the direct and the reflected beam can be fully accounted for by the DWBA scattering theory.

These complications are often more than offset by the fact that the dynamic enhancement of the scattering intensity is significant. Particularly string enhancement occurs for evanescent waves near the critical angle, giving rise to the Yoneda peak.

In combination with the straightforward scattering geometry, where all relevant information is contained in a single scattering image, in-situ and real-time experiments are facilitated. Specifically self-organization during MBE growth and re-organization processes in block copolymer films under the influence of solvent vapor have been characterized on the relevant timescales ranging from seconds to minutes. Ultimately the time resolution is limited by the x-ray flux on the samples necessary to collect an image and the read-out time of the area detector.

== Experimental practice ==
Dedicated or partially dedicated GISAXS beamlines exist at most synchrotron light sources (for instance Advanced Light Source (ALS), Australian Synchrotron, APS, ELETTRA (Italy), Diamond (UK), ESRF, National Synchrotron Light Source II (NSLS-II), Pohang Light Source (South Korea), SOLEIL (France), Shanghai Synchrotron (PR China), SSRL

At neutron research facilities, GISANS is increasingly used, typically on small-angle (SANS) instruments or on reflectometers.

GISAS does not require any specific sample preparation other than thin film deposition techniques. Film thicknesses may range from a few nm to several 100 nm, and such thin films are still fully penetrated by the x-ray beam. The film surface, the film interior, as well as the substrate-film interface are all accessible. By varying the incidence angle the various contributions can be identified.
