= Diffractometer =

Measuring instrument used to study the structure of a material using subatomic particles

A diffractometer is a measuring instrument for analyzing the structure of a material from the scattering pattern produced when a beam of radiation or particles (such as X-rays or neutrons) interacts with it.

== Principle ==
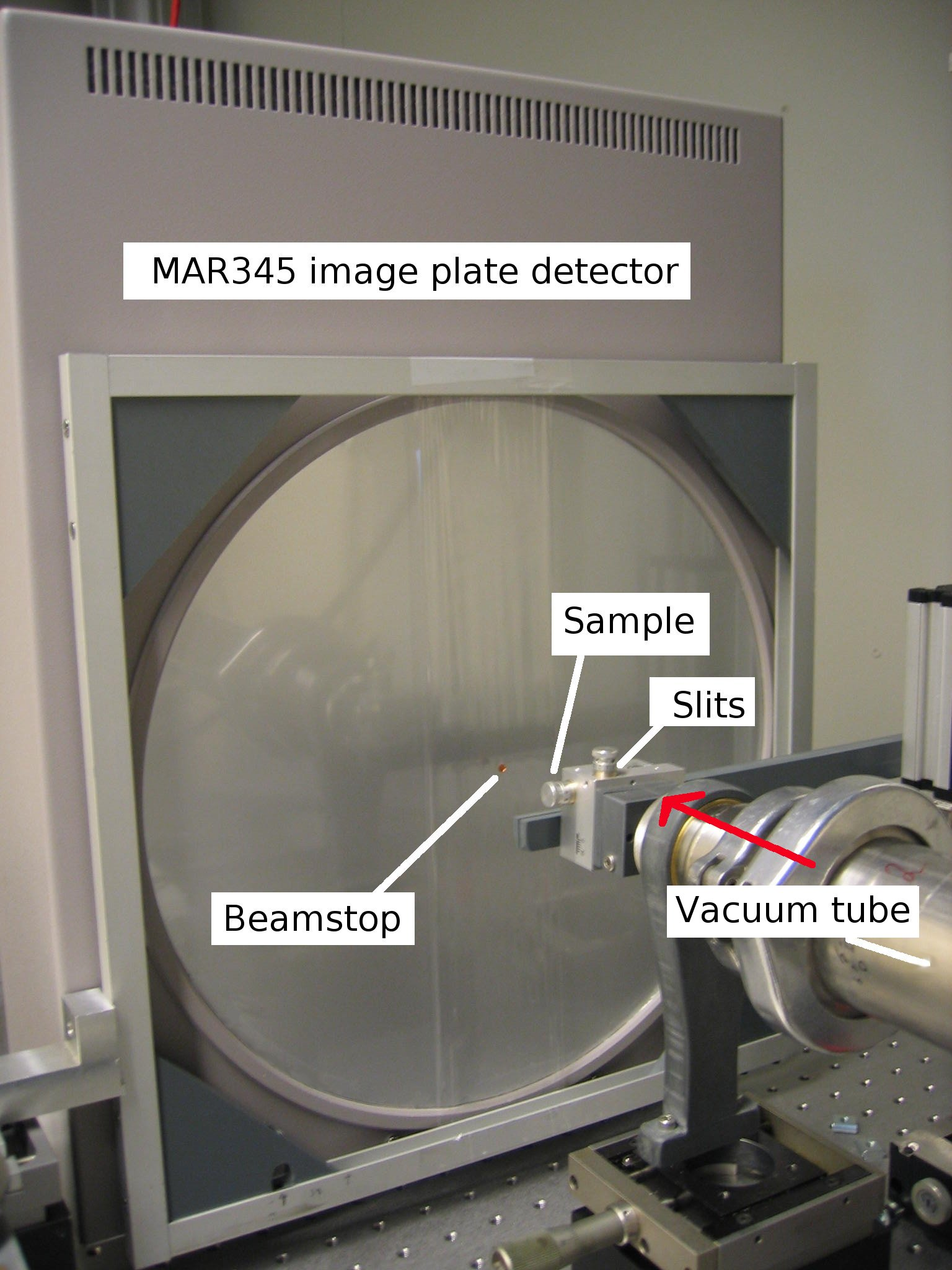
The detector end of a simple x-ray diffractometer with an area detector. The direction of the X-rays is indicated with the red arrow.

A typical diffractometer consists of a source of radiation, a monochromator to choose the wavelength, slits to adjust the shape of the beam, a sample and a detector. In a more complicated apparatus, a goniometer can also be used for fine adjustment of the sample and the detector positions. When an area detector is used to monitor the diffracted radiation, a beamstop is usually needed to stop the intense primary beam that has not been diffracted by the sample, otherwise the detector might be damaged. Usually the beamstop can be completely impenetrable to the X-rays or it may be semitransparent. The use of a semitransparent beamstop allows the possibility to determine how much the sample absorbs the radiation using the intensity observed through the beamstop.

There are several types of X-ray diffractometer, depending on the research field (material sciences, powder diffraction, life sciences, structural biology, etc.) and the experimental environment, if it is a laboratory with its home X-ray source or a Synchrotron. In laboratory, diffractometers are usually an "all in one" equipment, including the diffractometer, the video microscope and the X-ray source. Plenty of companies manufacture "all in one" equipment for X-ray home laboratory, such as Rigaku, Malvern Panalytical, Thermo Fisher Scientific, Bruker, Anton Paar and many others.

There are fewer diffractometer manufacturers for synchrotrons, owing to few numbers of x-ray beamlines to equip and the need of solid expertise of the manufacturer. For material sciences, Huber diffractometers are widely known and, for structural biology, Arinax diffractometers are the reference. Nonetheless, due to few numbers of manufacturers, a large amount of synchrotron diffractometers are "homemade" diffractometers, realized by synchrotron engineering teams.

== Uses ==
X-ray diffractometer instruments can be used for a variety of purposes including imaging crystal structures, phase determination, and identifying unfamiliar substances for use in crystallography, inspection, and pharmaceutical research for drug efficacy. A novel use of x-ray diffraction involves studying the surface of Mars to determine if it ever supported life.

== See also ==
- Crystallography
- International Centre for Diffraction Data
- Neutron diffraction
- Spallation Neutron Source
- X-ray crystallography
- X-ray diffraction
- Synchrotron
