= Yoneda peak =

Radiation phenomenon

Yoneda peak (also Yoneda–Vineyard peak) is an enhancement in scattering intensity from scattered radiation propagating as an evanescent wave underneath a surface or another material interface. It appears under an exit angle α_{f} that is close to the critical angle for total external reflection α_{c}. For x-rays and neutrons, critical angles are small. The Yoneda peak is typically observed in off-specular reflectometry and in grazing-incidence small-angle scattering (GISAS), where it is also used for calibration. The phenomenon was described by Yasuharu Yoneda in 1963 and later given a rigorous theoretical foundation by George H. Vineyard.

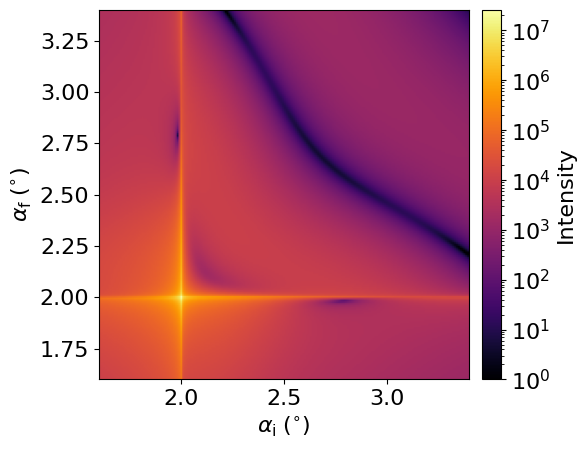
Off-specular scattering from a model system, consisting of dense disks on a substrate. The strong Yoneda peak appears as horizontal and vertical bands at a critical angle of 2 degrees. To keep the figure simple, the substrate was chosen to have the same average scattering-length density as the decorated layer. Simulated with BornAgain.
