= Miniflex =

X-ray diffraction analytical measuring instrument

Miniflex is an X-ray diffraction (XRD) analytical measuring instrument produced by Rigaku. The current instrument is the fourth in a series introduced in 1973.

Original Miniflex - ca. 1973

2nd Generation Miniflex - ca. 1976

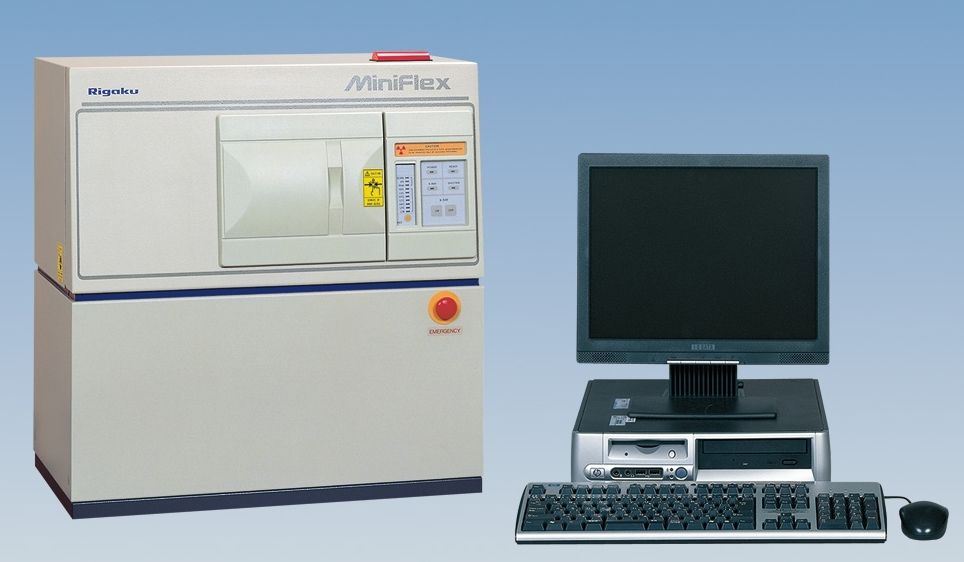
3rd Generation Miniflex - ca. 1995

The Rigaku MiniFlex is historically significant in that it was the first commercial benchtop (tabletop) X-ray diffraction instrument. When introduced in 1973, the original Miniflex was about one-tenth the size, and dramatically less expensive, than conventional X-ray diffraction equipment of the period. The original instrument, and its successor that was introduced in 1976, employed a horizontal goniometer with data output provided by an internal strip chart recorder.

The third generation device, introduced in 1995, was called Miniflex+. It provided a dramatic advance in x-ray power to 450 watts by operating at 30kV and 15mA as well as in the technology with computer control. Both the Miniflex+ and the current generation product employ a vertical goniometer that allowed the use of a 6-position automatic sample changer. The Miniflex II was introduced in 2006 and offered the advance of a monochromatic X-ray source and a 1D silicon strip detector. The fifth generation (Gen 5) MiniFlex600 system, introduced in 2012, built upon this legacy with 600W of tube power and new PDXL powder diffraction software. 2017 saw the introduction of the 6th generation MiniFlex incorporating a 2D hybrid pixel array detector (HPAD) and 8-position automatic sample changer. With the new generation of MiniFlex comes an update to the SmartLab Studio II software. It now offers important new functionality; including a fundamental parameter method (FP) for more accurate peak calculation, phase identification using the Crystallography Open Database (COD), and a wizard for ab inito crystal structure analysis.

== Teaching ==
The simplicity and relatively low cost of the Miniflex line has led to its widespread use in colleges and universities to illustrate the physics behind X-ray diffraction. In addition to Chemistry and Physics, many Geology departments also employ the Miniflex to teach mineralogy.

== Research ==
The MiniFlex is used in a wide range of industries as well as colleges and universities for research. Since 1973 over 12,000 patents and scientific papers have been published using data collected by a MiniFlex.
