= SBGrid Consortium =

Structural biology computing group

The SBGrid Consortium is a research computing group financially supported by participating research laboratories and operated out of Harvard Medical School. SBGrid provides the global structural biology community with support for research computing. Members of the SBGrid Consortium fund SBGrid's ongoing operations through an annual membership fee. The resulting organization is a user-supported and user-directed community resource.

SBGrid's primary service is the collection, deployment and maintenance of a comprehensive set of software and computational tools that are useful in structural biology research. As of 2015, SBGrid curates a collection of 300 structural biology applications for installation on computers in SBGrid laboratories around the world.

SBGrid also develops a specialized research computing infrastructure for structural biologists in the Boston area.

== Background ==
SBGrid was first created by Piotr Sliz as an in-house effort to support and maintain a few dozen X-ray crystallography in the laboratory of Stephen C. Harrison and the late Don Craig Wiley, then at Harvard University and Boston Children's Hospital. After adding support for additional labs, SBGrid began charging user fees to recover operational costs in 2002. It also expanded software support to include electron microscopy (EM), nuclear magnetic resonance (NMR) and other structural biology techniques. In response to requests from users for support for Macintosh computers, SBGrid recompiled most of its applications to run on the Mac OS X platform in 2004. By 2006, the SBGrid consortium included 37 laboratories at 14 different institutions.

SBGrid's user-oriented community began to solidify in 2008 with its first user meeting: Quo Vadis Structural Biology ("Where is structural biology heading?"). The meeting attracted approximately 300 participants and incorporated a structural biology symposium and three workshops: scientific programming with Python; molecular visualization with Maya; and macOS programming. SBGrid held subsequent meetings in Boston (2009, 2013, 2014). In 2011 SBGrid hosted the Open Science Grid All-Hands Meeting at Harvard Medical School after having established a Virtual Organization (SBGrid VO) within the Open Science Grid (OSG) and deployed a grid computing portal in 2010. SBGrid has become one of the top OSG users (outside of high-energy physics users) and utilizes ~5,000,000 CPU hours per year.

In 2012, SBGrid launched a webinar program featuring software tutorials from a different developer each month. Recordings are publicly available on the SBGridTV YouTube channel. SBGrid team members have also published a guide to software licensing, an editorial that advocates for better disclosure of source code, and recommendations for optimizing peer review of software source code.

By 2014, SBGrid had 245 member laboratories around the world.

== Membership ==
During the registration process, an SBGrid associate will advise new labs regarding hardware and computing requirements to deploy SBGrid support onsite. Once a new member laboratory's hardware is in place, most new members are fully operational with SBGrid within two weeks of joining.

=== SBGrid software services for members ===
The SBGrid team installs and maintains its collection of structural biology applications on Linux and OS X computers in member laboratories, including laptops. A few commercial applications are also supported, including Geneious for cloning and bioinformatics, incentive builds for PyMOL, and for North American labs, the Schrödinger Small-Molecule Drug Discovery Suite. Members access a complete execution environment that includes the suite of structural biology applications preconfigured to run without any additional settings.

SBGrid monitors all software websites for updates and installs major software upgrades on a monthly basis. The SBGrid team also recompile existing software for newer releases of supported operating systems and respond to user bug reports and new software requests.

=== Training for SBGrid members ===
SBGrid hosts monthly live webinars that feature tutorials by contributing developers and offer members the opportunity to ask the developer questions directly.

=== Resources for SBGrid members ===
The SBGrid technical team offers guidance to new members in setting up an adequate computing infrastructure. Members also benefit from access to a number of other specialized computing resources.

== SBGrid Resources for software developers ==
SBGrid provides developers of SBGrid-supported applications with access to the SBGrid build-test computing network at Harvard Medical School for building and testing software on a range of operating systems.
