= Preferential alignment =

The preferential alignment is a criterion of an orientation of a molecule or atom. The preferential alignment can be related to the formation of the crystal structure of an amorphous structure.

Polymeric masses with high atomic distances can either be in an oriented or non oriented state. These higher distances (up to 1000 Å) form great regions, where the molecular chains may be preferentially oriented, something which can happen independent to the existence or not of crystallinity.
