= Indirect Fourier transformation =

In a Fourier transformation (FT), the Fourier transformed function $\hat f(s)$ is obtained from $f(t)$ by:

$$\hat f(s) = \int_{-\infty}^\infty f(t)e^{-ist}dt$$

where $i$ is defined as $i^2=-1$. $f(t)$ can be obtained from $\hat f(s)$ by inverse FT:

$$f(t) = \frac{1}{2\pi}\int_{-\infty}^\infty \hat f(s)e^{ist}dt$$

$s$ and $t$ are inverse variables, e.g. frequency and time.

Obtaining $\hat f(s)$ directly requires that $f(t)$ is well known from $t=-\infty$ to $t=\infty$, vice versa. In real experimental data this is rarely the case due to noise and limited measured range, say $f(t)$ is known from $a>-\infty$ to $b<\infty$. Performing a FT on $f(t)$ in the limited range may lead to systematic errors and overfitting.

An indirect Fourier transform (IFT) is a solution to this problem.

== Indirect Fourier transformation in small-angle scattering ==
In small-angle scattering on single molecules, an intensity $I(\mathbf{r})$ is measured and is a function of the magnitude of the scattering vector $q = |\mathbf{q}| = 4\pi \sin(\theta)/\lambda$, where $2\theta$ is the scattered angle, and $\lambda$ is the wavelength of the incoming and scattered beam (elastic scattering). $q$ has units 1/length. $I(q)$ is related to the so-called pair distance distribution $p(r)$ via Fourier Transformation. $p(r)$ is a (scattering weighted) histogram of distances $r$ between pairs of atoms in the molecule. In one dimensions ($r$ and $q$ are scalars), $I(q)$ and $p(r)$ are related by:

$$I(q) = 4\pi n\int_{-\infty}^\infty p(r)e^{-iqr\cos(\phi)}dr$$

$$p(r) = \frac{1}{2\pi^2n}\int_{-\infty}^\infty\hat (qr)^2 I(q)e^{-iqr\cos(\phi)}dq$$

where $\phi$ is the angle between $\mathbf{q}$ and $\mathbf{r}$, and $n$ is the number density of molecules in the measured sample. The sample is orientational averaged (denoted by $\langle .. \rangle$), and the Debye equation can thus be exploited to simplify the relations by

$$\langle e^{-iqr\cos(\phi)}\rangle = \langle e^{iqr\cos(\phi)}\rangle = \frac{\sin(qr)}{qr}$$

In 1977 Glatter proposed an IFT method to obtain $p(r)$ form $I(q)$, and three years later, Moore introduced an alternative method. Others have later introduced alternative methods for IFT, and automatised the process

== The Glatter method of IFT ==
This is a brief outline of the method introduced by Otto Glatter. For simplicity, we use $n=1$ in the following.

In indirect Fourier transformation, a guess on the largest distance in the particle $D_{max}$ is given, and an initial distance distribution function $p_i(r)$ is expressed as a sum of $N$ cubic spline functions $\phi_i(r)$ evenly distributed on the interval (0,$p_i(r)$):

$$p_i(r) = \sum_{i=1}^N c_i\phi_i(r),$$	1

where $c_i$ are scalar coefficients. The relation between the scattering intensity $I(q)$ and the $p(r)$ is:

$$I(q) = 4\pi\int_0^\infty p(r)\frac{\sin(qr)}{qr}\text{d}r.$$	2

Inserting the expression for p_{i}(r) (1) into (2) and using that the transformation from $p(r)$ to $I(q)$ is linear gives:

$$I(q) = 4\pi\sum_{i=1}^N c_i\psi_i(q),$$

where $\psi_i(q)$ is given as:

$$\psi_i(q)=\int_0^\infty\phi_i(r)\frac{\sin(qr)}{qr}\text{d}r.$$

The $c_i$'s are unchanged under the linear Fourier transformation and can be fitted to data, thereby obtaining the coefficients $c_i^{fit}$. Inserting these new coefficients into the expression for $p_i(r)$ gives a final $p_f(r)$. The coefficients $c_i^{fit}$ are chosen to minimise the $\chi^2$ of the fit, given by:

$$\chi^2 = \sum_{k=1}^{M}\frac{[I_{experiment}(q_k)-I_{fit}(q_k)]^2}{\sigma^2(q_k)}$$

where $M$ is the number of datapoints and $\sigma_k$ is the standard deviations on data point $k$. The fitting problem is ill posed and a very oscillating function would give the lowest $\chi^2$ despite being physically unrealistic. Therefore, a smoothness function $S$ is introduced:

$$S = \sum_{i=1}^{N-1}(c_{i+1}-c_i)^2$$.

The larger the oscillations, the higher $S$. Instead of minimizing $\chi^2$, the Lagrangian $L = \chi^2 + \alpha S$ is minimized, where the Lagrange multiplier $\alpha$ is denoted the smoothness parameter. The method is indirect in the sense that the FT is done in several steps: $p_i(r) \rightarrow \text{fitting} \rightarrow p_f(r)$.

== See also ==
- Frequency spectrum
- Least-squares spectral analysis
