= Fluctuation X-ray scattering =

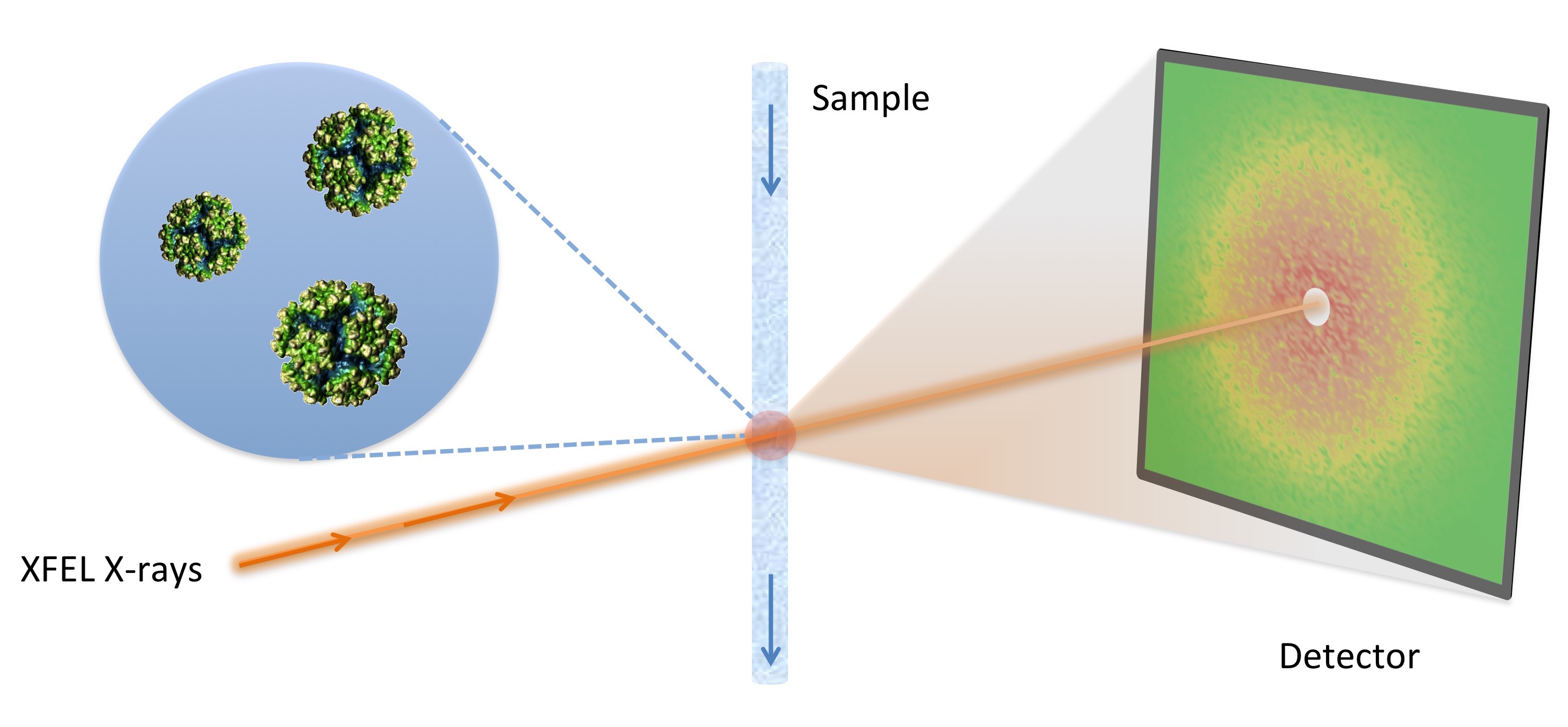
A fluctuation scattering experiment collects a series of X-ray diffraction snapshots of multiple proteins (or other particles) in solution. An ultrabright X-ray laser provides fast snapshots, containing features that are angularly non-isotropic (speckle), ultimately resulting in a detailed understanding of the structure of the sample.

Fluctuation X-ray scattering (FXS) is an X-ray scattering technique similar to small-angle X-ray scattering (SAXS), but is performed using X-ray exposures below sample rotational diffusion times. This technique, ideally performed with an ultra-bright X-ray light source, such as a free electron laser, results in data containing significantly more information as compared to traditional scattering methods.

FXS can be used for the determination of (large) macromolecular structures, but has also found applications in the characterization of metallic nanostructures, magnetic domains and colloids.

The most general setup of FXS is a situation in which fast diffraction snapshots of models are taken which over a long time period undergo a full 3D rotation. A particularly interesting subclass of FXS is the 2D case where the sample can be viewed as a 2-dimensional system with particles exhibiting random in-plane rotations. In this case, an analytical solution exists relation the FXS data to the structure. In absence of symmetry constraints, no analytical data-to-structure relation for the 3D case is available, although various iterative procedures have been developed.

== Overview ==
An FXS experiment consists of collecting a large number of X-ray snapshots of samples in a different random configuration. By computing angular intensity correlations for each image and averaging these over all snapshots, the average 2-point correlation function can be subjected to a finite Legendre transform, resulting in a collection of so-called B_{l}(q,q') curves, where l is the Legendre polynomial order and q / q' the momentum transfer or inverse resolution of the data.

== Mathematical background ==
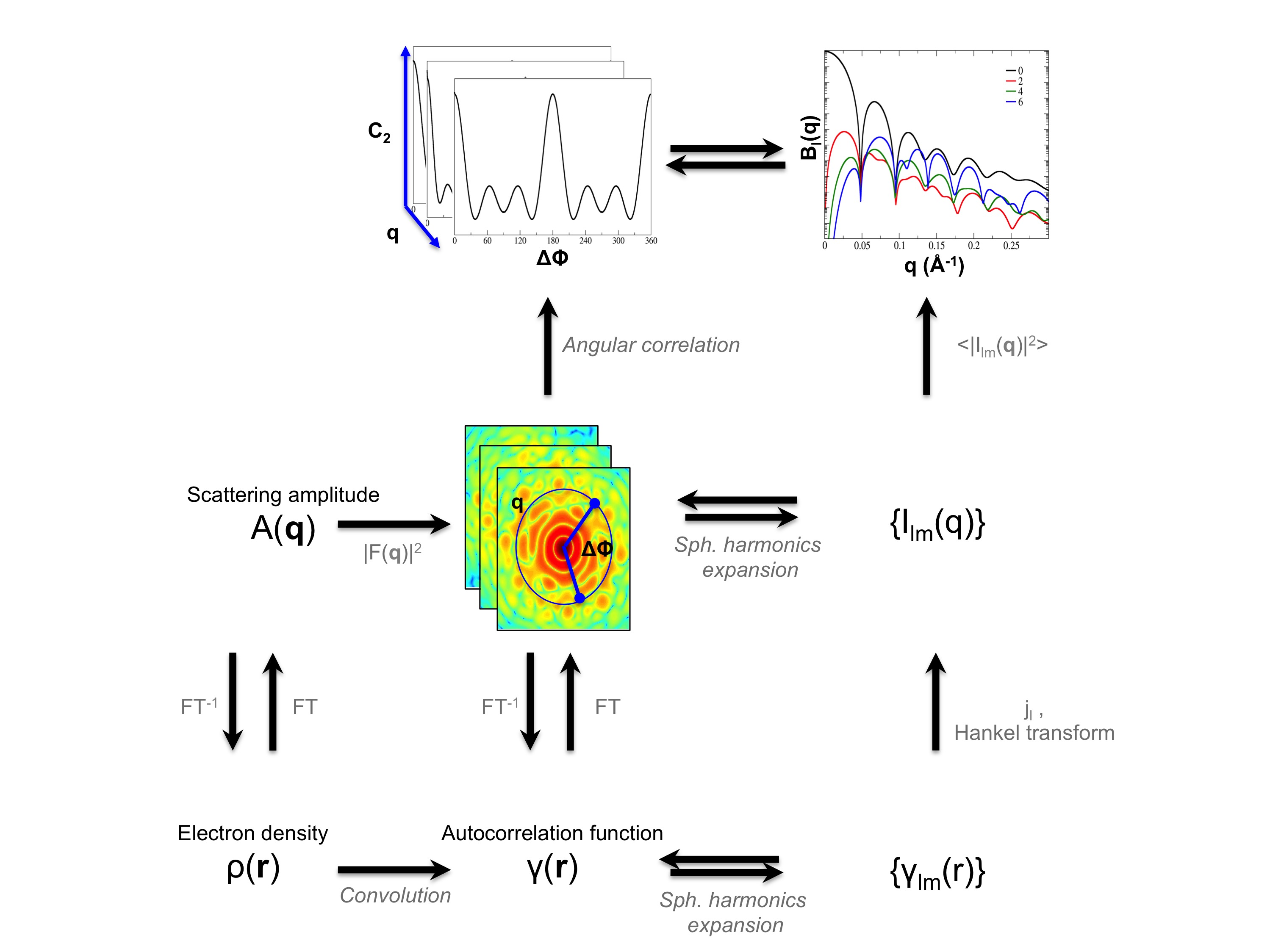
A visual representation of mathematical relations in Fluctuation X-ray Scattering illustrates the relation between the electron density, scattering amplitude, diffracted intensities and angular correlation data. Image modified from

Given a particle with density distribution $\rho(\mathbf{r})$, the associated three-dimensional complex structure factor $A(\mathbf{q})$ is obtained via a Fourier transform

$$A(\mathbf{q}) = \int_V \rho(\mathbf{r}) \exp[i\mathbf{qr}] d \mathbf{r}$$

The intensity function corresponding to the complex structure factor is equal to

$$I(\mathbf{q}) = A(\mathbf{q}) A(\mathbf{q}) ^*$$

where $^*$ denotes complex conjugation. Expressing $I(\mathbf{q})$ as a spherical harmonics series, one obtains

$$I(\mathbf{q}) = \sum_{l=0}^{\infty} \sum_{m=-l}^{l} I_{lm}(q) Y_l^m(\theta_q,\phi_q)$$

The average angular intensity correlation as obtained from many diffraction images $J_k(q,\phi_q)$ is then

$$C_2(q,q',\Delta\phi_q) = \frac{1}{2\pi N}\sum_{N images} \int_0^{2\pi} J_k(q,\phi_q) J_k(q',\phi_q+\Delta\phi_q) d \phi_q$$

It can be shown that

$$C_2(q,q',\Delta\phi_q) = \sum_l B_l(q,q') P_l( \cos( \theta_q )\cos( \theta_{q'} ) + \sin( \theta_q )\sin( \theta_{q'} ) \cos[ \Delta \phi_q] )$$

where

$$\theta_q = \arccos( \frac{q\lambda} {4 \pi} )$$

with $\lambda$ equal to the X-ray wavelength used, and

$$B_l(q,q') = \sum_{m=-l}^{l} I_{lm}(q) I_{lm}^*(q')$$

$P_l(\cdot)$ is a Legendre Polynome. The set of $B_l(q,q')$ curves can be obtained via a finite Legendre transform from the observed autocorrelation $C_2(q,q',\Delta\phi_q)$ and are thus directly related to the structure $\rho(\mathbf{r})$ via the above expressions.

Additional relations can be obtained by obtaining the real space autocorrelation $\gamma(\mathbf{r})$ of the density:

$$\gamma(\mathbf{r}) = \int_V \rho(u)\rho(\mathbf{r}-\mathbf{u}) d \mathbf{u}$$

A subsequent expansion of $\gamma(\mathbf{r})$ in a spherical harmonics series, results in radial expansion coefficients that are related to the intensity function via a Hankel transform

$$I_{lm}(q) = \int_0^{\infty} \gamma_{lm}(r) j_l(qr) r^2 d r$$

A concise overview of these relations has been published elsewhere

== Basic relations ==
A generalized Guinier law describing the low resolution behavior of the data can be derived from the above expressions:

$$\log B_l(q) - 2 l \log q \approx \log B_l^{*} - \frac{2q^2R_l^2}{2l+3}$$

Values of $B_l^*$ and $R_l$ can be obtained from a least squares analyses of the low resolution data.

The falloff of the data at higher resolution is governed by Porod laws. It can be shown that the Porod laws derived for SAXS/WAXS data hold here as well, ultimately resulting in:

$$B_l(q) \propto q^{-8}$$

for particles with well-defined interfaces.

== Structure determination from FXS data ==
Currently, there are three routes to determine molecular structure from its corresponding FXS data.

=== Algebraic phasing ===
By assuming a specific symmetric configuration of the final model, relations between expansion coefficients describing the scattering pattern of the underlying species can be exploited to determine a diffraction pattern consistent with the measure correlation data. This approach has been shown to be feasible for icosahedral and helical models.

=== Reverse Monte Carlo ===
By representing the to-be-determined structure as an assembly of independent scattering voxels, structure determination from FXS data is transformed into a global optimisation problem and can be solved using simulated annealing.

=== Multi-tiered iterative phasing ===
The multi-tiered iterative phasing algorithm (M-TIP) overcomes convergence issues associated with the reverse Monte Carlo procedure and eliminates the need to use or derive specific symmetry constraints as needed by the Algebraic method. The M-TIP algorithm utilizes non-trivial projections that modifies a set of trial structure factors $A(\mathbf{q})$ such that corresponding $B_l(q,q')$ match observed values. The real-space image $\rho(\mathbf{r})$, as obtained by a Fourier Transform of $A(\mathbf{q})$ is subsequently modified to enforce symmetry, positivity and compactness. The M-TIP procedure can start from a random point and has good convergence properties.
