= Wide-angle X-ray scattering =

Technique in X-ray crystallography

In X-ray crystallography, wide-angle X-ray scattering (WAXS) or wide-angle X-ray diffraction (WAXD) is the analysis of Bragg peaks scattered to wide angles, which (by Bragg's law) are caused by sub-nanometer-sized structures. It is an X-ray-diffraction method and commonly used to determine a range of information about crystalline materials. The term WAXS is commonly used in polymer sciences to differentiate it from SAXS but many scientists doing "WAXS" would describe the measurements as Bragg/X-ray/powder diffraction or crystallography.

Wide-angle X-ray scattering is similar to small-angle X-ray scattering (SAXS) but the increasing angle between the sample and detector is probing smaller length scales. This requires samples to be more ordered/crystalline for information to be extracted. In a dedicated SAXS instrument the distance from sample to the detector is longer to increase angular resolution. Most diffractometers can be used to perform both WAXS and limited SAXS in a single run (small- and wide-angle scattering, SWAXS) by adding a beamstop/knife edge.

== Applications ==
The WAXS technique is used to determine the degree of crystallinity of polymer samples. It can also be used to determine the chemical composition or phase composition of a film, the texture of a film (preferred alignment of crystallites), the crystallite size and presence of film stress. As with other diffraction methods, the sample is scanned in a wide-angle X-ray goniometer, and the scattering intensity is plotted as a function of the 2θ angle.

X-ray diffraction is a non destructive method of characterization of solid materials. When X-rays are directed at solids they scatter in predictable patterns based on the internal structure of the solid. A crystalline solid consists of regularly spaced atoms (electrons) that can be described by imaginary planes. The distance between these planes is called the d-spacing.

The intensity of the d-space pattern is directly proportional to the number of electrons (atoms) in the imaginary planes. Every crystalline solid has a unique pattern of d-spacings (known as the powder pattern), which is a fingerprint for that solid. Solids with the same chemical composition but different phases can be identified by their pattern of d-spacings.
