= Rigaku =

Japanese X-ray equipment manufacturer

Rigaku Corporation
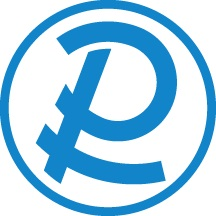
- Industry: Scientific instruments
- Founded: 1951
- Founder: Yoshihiro Shimura
- Headquarters: Tokyo, Japan
- Key people: Jun Kawakami (President & CEO)
- Revenue: ¥ 63 billion (FY 2022) ($ 420 million) (FY 2022)
- Number of employees: 1,800 (2022)
- Website: Official website

Rigaku Corporation is an international manufacturer and distributor of scientific, analytical and industrial instrumentation specializing in X-ray related technologies, including X-ray crystallography, X-ray diffraction (XRD), X-ray reflectivity, X-ray fluorescence (XRF), automation, cryogenics, and X-ray optics.

== Locations ==
Rigaku is headquartered in Tokyo, Japan, with additional production, research and laboratory facilities located in both Japan and the United States. Subsidiaries in North America include Rigaku Americas Corporation (The Woodlands, Texas, United States), Applied Rigaku Technologies (Austin, Texas, USA) and Rigaku Innovative Technologies (Auburn Hills, Michigan, United States). European branches are located in Neu-Isenburg near Frankfurt, Germany, Prague, Czech Republic and Poland (Wrocław).

== Products ==
Rigaku manufactures and supplies scientific instrumentation to academia, industry and trade. These include X-ray diffractometers, single crystal diffractometers, X-ray Imagers, X-ray fluorescence spectrometers (both Energy Dispersive and Wavelength Dispersive varieties), thermal analysis equipment, Handheld Raman and LIBS analyzers and X-ray and EUV optics, X-ray sources, and X-ray detectors. They also manage the Rigaku Journal.

A large part of Rigaku's business is tools used to measure and inspect semi-conductor wafers.

Rigaku manufactures several detectors useful to law enforcement. These include hand-held field drug detectors, as well detectors for dangerous chemicals and explosives. In 2024 Rigaku announced a grant assistance programme to help law enforcement agencies in the US to procure funding to obtain these devices.

== History ==
1951 Rigaku was founded by Dr. Yoshihiro Shimura.

1952 The core innovation of the company was the introduction of the world's first commercially available rotating anode X-ray generator.

1954 Rigaku introduced the first automatic-recording X-ray diffractometer.

1973 Rigaku introduced the Miniflex series of X-ray diffraction measurement instruments.

1976 Rigaku developed the first parallel-beam type X-ray diffractometer for stress analysis, as well as the first X-ray fluorescence spectrometers capable of carbon analysis (1976) and boron analysis (1981).

2021 Rigaku announced that the global investment firm The Carlyle Group (NASDAQ: CG) and Mr. Hikaru Shimura, Chairman of Rigaku, agreed to jointly acquire all outstanding shares of Rigaku, through a holding company to be newly set up by Carlyle and Mr. Shimura. Carlyle's stake ended up being approximately 80% of the shares, with Mr. Shimura owning the remainder.

2023 Jun Kawakami replaced Toshiyuki Ikeda as President & CEO), and remains CEO as of July 2025.

== Business ==
In 2024, Rigaku held an IPO, in which ¥112.3 Billion (~$750 Million US) was raised. This was the second biggest Japanese IPO for the year.

In 2023, Rigaku's revenue was ¥79.9 Billion, with a profit of ¥15.3 Billion. One third of the company's revenue came from the semiconductor and electronics sector.

Rigaku's revenue is 30% domestic, and 70% overseas.
