= Bliss (charity) =

UK-based charity for infants

- Formation: 1979
- Legal status: Registered charity
- Headquarters: London
- Location: United Kingdom
- Region served: England, Scotland, Wales, Northern Ireland, Channel Islands
- Website: http://www.bliss.org.uk

Bliss is a UK-based charity for infants. Bliss supports the families of babies in neonatal care and works with health professionals to provide training and improve care for babies. It campaigns for improved hospital resources across England, Scotland, Wales and Northern Ireland, and is actively involved in neonatal research. Its chief executive is Caroline Lee-Davey.

== History ==
Bliss was founded in 1979 when a letter was sent to the Daily Telegraph in response to a story on neonatal intensive care units. The article said that no hospital had all the equipment it needed to safely care for the premature and sick babies in their care. Allan Chilvers suggested setting up a society to raise funds for life-saving equipment like incubators for premature babies and Bliss (Baby Life Support Systems) was founded. In five years Bliss raised £750,000 and donated equipment to 82 hospitals.

The 1990s saw the introduction of artificial pulmonary surfactants and antenatal steroids which reduced infant mortality and meant more premature babies began to survive. During this decade, Bliss was chosen as the charity for the Blue Peter appeal twice, raising £2.7 million and helping to raise awareness about underfunding in neonatal intensive care units.

In 2000, Bliss ran a campaign to show that neonatal units in the UK were relying on the charity for equipment, rather than the NHS. The story made the front page of the Daily Express and £6.5 million was then announced for neonatal intensive care. From then on, Bliss decided to spend less money on equipment and started funding medical training and research.

== Services for families ==
Bliss aims to provide support for families through an email helpline, parent forum (in partnership with Netmums), information on their website, and through volunteers who provide face-to-face support on the neonatal unit. It also provides free information on subjects such as kangaroo care and weaning a premature baby, as well as Little Bliss magazine, which contains stories and tips from parents and healthcare professionals.

== Improving care on neonatal units ==
Bliss champions family-centred care, an approach which can lower a baby’s stress levels, shorten hospital stays, reduce hospital readmissions and improve long-term health outcomes by supporting parents to provide hands on care when they are in hospital.

The Bliss Baby Charter is a practical framework to assess neonatal units on their delivery of family-centred care. It encourages units to improve care through a series of audits, and awards units for delivering family-centred care to an excellent standard.

Two neonatal units have been accredited with the Bliss Baby Charter – Southampton and Portsmouth – and in 2017, 130 out of 195 units are taking part in the Bliss Baby Charter.

== Campaigns ==
Bliss raise awareness of the issues affecting babies in neonatal care by campaigning for change within government and the NHS. In February 2014 Bliss launched a campaign urging for more financial help for families with babies in hospital, called 'It's not a game: the very real costs of having a premature or sick baby'.

Bliss released the Bliss Baby Report for England in 2015, shortly followed by Bliss Baby Report: time for change for Wales in 2016, and the Bliss Scotland Baby Report in January 2017. They found that neonatal services in both England and Scotland are lacking enough nurses and doctors to meet standards for high-quality care. Along with this, services are also struggling to give parents enough practical support to care for their baby, such as free overnight accommodation and support with meal costs.

Bliss also campaign for flexibility in the school starting age. This has led to a revised English School Admissions Code in December 2014, alongside updated guidance, Advice on the Admission of Summer Born Children. Furthermore, in September 2015, Nick Gibb MP released an open letter stating his intention to make further changes to the School Admissions Code so summer-born children can automatically start reception at five years old. He has committed to considering allowing due date, rather than birth date, to be used when making admissions decisions.

The Parental Bereavement (Pay and Leave) Bill for which Bliss campaigned became an Act of Parliament on 13 September 2018. Bliss continues to campaign for an extension to parental leave and pay for parents whose babies are in neonatal care. The Government launched a consultation into these proposals in July 2019.

== Research ==
Bliss works in partnership to promote and support best practice in neonatal care, and is currently involved in over £10.1 million of research which is responsible for significant improvements in the care and treatment of babies born premature or sick.

=== The Epicure Study ===
Since 1995 Bliss has supported the EPICure study, the longest running study into prematurity in the world, which tracks the chances of survival and later health status of babies born at less than 26 weeks gestational age. This study is helping to inform healthcare and education services to ensure the right support is provided at all times for premature and sick babies as they grow towards adulthood.

=== Standardised Concentrate with Added Macronutrients Parenteral (SCAMP Study) ===
The heads of babies that are born extremely premature (less than 29 weeks) do not grow very well, which affects how their brains develop later. Many of these babies are fed intravenously, directly into a vein, in the first month of life as their gut is too immature to digest milk in high enough quantities for their nutritional needs. The SCAMP study, which was funded by Bliss, wanted to investigate whether improving the nutritional content of the babies’ intravenous feeds improves early head growth, which could affect brain development and ultimately the future quality of life for very premature babies.

Results: The study showed head growth in the first 28 days of life can be improved by increasing the protein and energy content of the intravenous feed in babies less than 29 weeks, which continues up to 36 weeks. Other studies have found that there is a link between head circumference and IQ, and it is also believed that this increased brain growth could prevent learning difficulties and cerebral palsy.

== World Prematurity Day ==
17 November is World Prematurity Day. Bliss marks this international awareness day with other organisations from around the world. The group of organisations is known as the World Prematurity Network and is made up of consumer and parent groups that are leaders in addressing preterm birth in their countries. Members of the World Prematurity Network call for actions to prevent preterm birth and to improve care for babies born premature.

As well as Bliss, the World Prematurity Network includes:

- The March of Dimes Foundation (United States)
- The European foundation for the care of newborn infants (EFCNI)
- The National Premmie Foundation (Australia)
- Little Big Souls (Africa)
- Borngreat Foundation (United States)
- Canadian Premature Babies Foundation (Canada)
- Home for Premature Babies (China)
- Con Amor Venceras (Mexico)
- Prematuridade (Brazil)

In 2016 Bliss raised over £12,000 from their World Prematurity campaign that focused on the need for high quality, family-centred care for all premature babies. Watch the family-centred care video here.
