= Nils Bergman =

Swedish perinatal neuroscientist

- Born: 23 March 1955 (age 71); Uppsala, Sweden
- Education: University of Cape Town; University of the Western Cape
- Occupation: Consulting Public Health Physician (Perinatal neuroscience)
- Known for: One of the founders of the Kangaroo Mother Care movement
- Spouse(s): Jill Bergman, a practising Doula / Kangaroula
- Website: ninobirth.org

Nils Bergman (23 March 1955) is a Swedish specialist in perinatal neuroscience and a promoter of skin-to-skin contact between a mother and newborn.

== Background ==
Bergman was born in Sweden but grew up in Zimbabwe, and then moved to Cape Town, South Africa, where he received his medical degree at the University of Cape Town, followed by a Masters in Public Health at the University of the Western Cape and a doctoral dissertation on scorpion stings. He returned to Zimbabwe in the 1980s as a mission doctor, and| started practising what is now known as Kangaroo Mother Care on babies born prematurely.

== Work ==
In lieu of incubators in the remote Manama Mission hospital, Bergman as Medical Superintendent and District Medical Officer together with Midwife Agneta Jurisoo started practicing skin to skin contact between a mother and premature child upon birth. He found that this method showed a significant increase of their survival, with survival rates increasing from 10% to 50% in very low birth weight babies (1000g to 1500g). This suggested that what he called "Kangaroo Mother Care" stabilisation was better than an incubator.

In 1995, Bergman brought it to South Africa and in 2000, it became the official policy for care of premature babies in the hospitals of the Western Cape province.

Bergman contributed to the naming and formal description of Kangaroo Mother Care together with 30 other researchers, and the subsequent WHO guidelines.

Since 2006 he has worked freelance, focusing on promoting and researching the use of skin-to-skin contact from birth, and on developing a better understanding of the neuroscience of birth, skin-to-skin, breastfeeding, bonding and secure attachment.

== Professional involvement ==
Bergman is the founder of the International Network of Kangaroo Mother Care (INK), and a member of the advisory board of La Leche League, South Africa, the Breastfeeding Association of SA, the International Lactation Consultants Association, Milk Matters (Human Milk Bank, Cape Town), and a Trustee of the South African Kangaroo Mother Care Foundation.

== Published works ==
Bergman N, Jurisoo A. The "kangaroo-method" for treating low birth weight babies in a developing country. Tropical Doctor, April 1994, 24: 57-60.

Kirsten GF, Bergman NJ, Hann FM. Kangaroo Mother Care in the Nursery. Pediatric Clinics of North America, 2001 Vol 48(2) 443 - 454

Moore ER, Anderson GC, Bergman N, Dowswell T. Early skin-to-skin contact for mothers and their healthy newborn infants. Cochrane Database Syst Rev 2012;5:CD003519.

Bergman NJ. Neonatal stomach volume and physiology suggest feeding at 1-h intervals. Acta Paediatr 2013;102:773-777.

Bergman NJ. Proposal for mechanisms of protection of supine sleep against sudden infant death syndrome: an integrated mechanism review. Pediatr Res 2014;doi: 10.1038/pr.2014.140. [Epub ahead of print].

Bergman N. The neuroscience of birth - and the case for zero separation. Curationis 2014;37:1-4.

Bergman NJ, Linley LL, Fawcus SR. RCT of skin-to-skin contact from birth versus conventional incubator care for physiological stabilisation in 1200- and 2199-gram newborns. Acta Paediatrica 2004 Vol 93(6); 779-785

Aiano Cattaneo, Riccardo Davanzo, Nils Bergman Nathalie Charpak. Kangaroo mother care in low-income countries. Journal of Tropical Paediatrics 1998; 44: 279- 282.

Hann M, Malan A, Kronson M, Bergman N, Huskisson R. Kangaroo Mother Care. South African Medical Journal, 1999 Vol 89; 37-40

Bigelow AE, Littlejohn M, Bergman N, McDonald C. The relation between early mother-infant skin-to-skin contact and later maternal sensitivity in South African mothers of low birth weight infants. Infant Mental Health Journal, 2010 Vol 31(3); 358-377

Morgan BE, Horn A, Bergman NJ. Should neonates sleep alone? Biological Psychiatry, 2011. doi:10.1016/j.biopsych.2011.06.018
