= Infant massage =

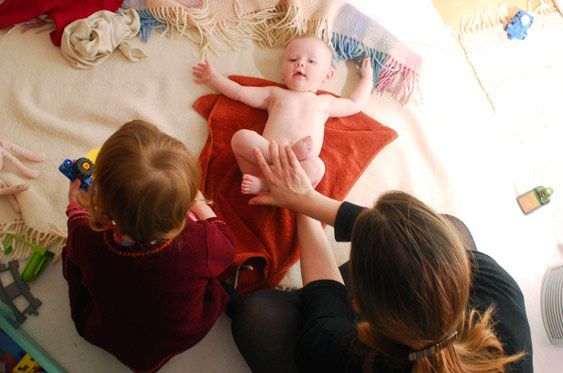
Infant massage

Infant massage is a type of complementary and alternative treatment that uses massage therapy for babies. Evidence is insufficient to support its use in either full term or preterm babies to achieve physical growth.

== History ==
Ayurvedic medicine in ancient India taught the use of infant massage. It was also has been encouraged in China during the Qing dynasty. At present it is part of traditional childcare in South Asia and elsewhere where daily massage by mothers is seen as "instilling fearlessness, hardening bone structure, enhancing movement and limb coordination, and increasing weight". Other areas where infant massage is regularly used are African countries and areas in the former Soviet Union. In Western culture, infant massage has been increasingly used in neonatal intensive care units for pre-term infants who are in stressful environments and have limited tactile stimulation.

== Research ==
A 2013 Cochrane review of massage therapy for babies less than 6 months of age who were born at term found that the evidence was insufficient to support its use. A 2004 Cochrane review looking at massage therapy for pre-term and low birth weight was insufficient to justify its use. Studies have shown improvements in sleep quality in babies who received massage therapy. Combined with conventional phototherapy, infant massage improved bilirubin levels, and it also acted prophylactically against jaundice in healthy newborns. A randomized controlled trial involving healthy term-born infants found that routine parent-led massage during the first four months of life was associated with electroencephalographic (EEG) patterns consistent with advanced maturation of brain patterns compared with infants who did not receive massage. Research indicates that infant massage can effectively support motor development across multiple domains, including locomotion, stationary abilities, reflexes, visual-motor coordination, and hand-eye coordination. Benefits have been observed in both typically developing infants and those with conditions such as prematurity or Down syndrome, likely through stimulation of limb movement and overall motor activity.

== Emotional and Social Benefits ==
Infant massage has been associated with enhanced emotional and social development in both infants and caregivers. Regular massage can strengthen parent-infant bonding, fostering closer interaction, reinforcing emotional attachment, and improving the overall quality of parental care. Caregivers, particularly mothers of preterm infants, often report reduced anxiety and depressive symptoms, along with increased confidence and satisfaction in their parenting role after learning infant massage techniques. In addition, practicing infant massage has been shown to positively influence maternal mental health, with decreases in physiological stress markers such as cortisol, reflecting reduced stress levels.

== Proposed mechanisms ==
Various mechanisms have been proposed as to suggest how massage therapy might benefit infants. For pre-term infants, it has been suggested that any weight gain may be due to improved metabolic efficiency or by reducing the adverse reaction of stress through decreasing stress behavior or stress hormones. Other possible mechanisms include increased vagal activity and secretion of insulin and gastrin as well as improved parent-infant relationships.

== Safety ==
Reviews of the literature have found no significant risks for adverse events with massage theory with either full term or pre-term infants. One study found that the use of certain oils in traditional societies such as mustard oil or olive oil might adversely affect pre-term newborn skin barrier function, while using other oils that are linoleate-enriched such as sunflower seed oil may improve the integrity and permeability of the skin.

== See also ==
- Babywearing
- Haptic communication
- Kangaroo care
- Pediatric massage
- Swaddling
