= Georges Charpak =

Polish-born French physicist

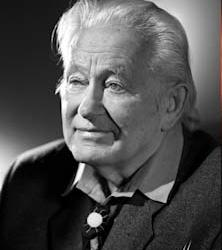
- Charpak in 2005
- Born: 1 August 1924; Dąbrowica, Wołyń Voivodeship, Second Polish Republic
- Died: 29 September 2010 (aged 86); Paris, France
- Citizenship: France (1946–2010)
- Education: École des Mines; Collège de France (PhD)
- Known for: Inventing the MicroMegas detector; Inventing the wire chamber
- Spouse: Dominique Vidal (m. 1953)
- Children: 3, including Nathalie
- Relatives: André Charpak (brother)
- Awards: Prix Jean Ricard (1973); High Energy and Particle Physics Prize (1989); Nobel Prize in Physics (1992)
- Scientific career
- Fields: Physics
- Workplaces: CERN; ESPCI Paris
- Doctoral advisor: Frédéric Joliot-Curie

Hersz Georges Charpak (French: [ʒɔʁʒ ʃaʁpak]; 1 August 1924 – 29 September 2010) was a Polish-born French physicist who received the Nobel Prize in Physics in 1992 for his invention of the multiwire proportional chamber.

== Life ==
Georges Charpak was born on 1 August 1924 to Jewish parents, Chana (Szapiro) and Maurice Charpak, in the village of Dąbrowica in Poland (now Dubrovytsia in Ukraine). Charpak's family moved from Poland to Paris when he was seven years old, beginning his study of mathematics in 1941 at the Lycée Saint-Louis. The actor and film director André Charpak was his younger brother.

During World War II Charpak served in the resistance and was imprisoned by Vichy authorities in 1943. In 1944 he was deported to the Nazi concentration camp at Dachau, where he remained until the camp was liberated in 1945.

After classes préparatoires studies at Lycée Saint-Louis in Paris and later at Lycée Joffre in Montpellier, he joined in 1945 the Paris-based École des Mines, one of the most prestigious engineering schools in France. The following year he became a naturalized French citizen. He graduated in 1948, earning the French degree of Civil Engineer of Mines (Ingénieur Civil des Mines equivalent to a Master's degree) becoming a pupil in the laboratory of Frédéric Joliot-Curie at the Collège de France during 1949, the year after Curie had directed construction of the first atomic pile within France. While at the Collège, Charpak secured a research position for the National Centre for Scientific Research (CNRS). He received his PhD in 1954 in nuclear physics at the Collège de France, receiving the qualification after having written a thesis on the subject of very-low-energy radiation due to disintegration of nuclei (Charpak & Suzor).

He remained politically engaged: in 1972, together with Daniele Amati, he launched a petition against the Vietnam War. Several years later, he initiated the Juri Orlow Committee to protest the imprisonment of the human rights activist in the former Soviet Union.

Charpak married Dominique Vidal in 1953. They had three children. The pediatrician Nathalie Charpak (born 1955) is his daughter. Charpak died on 29 September 2010, in Paris, at the age of 86.

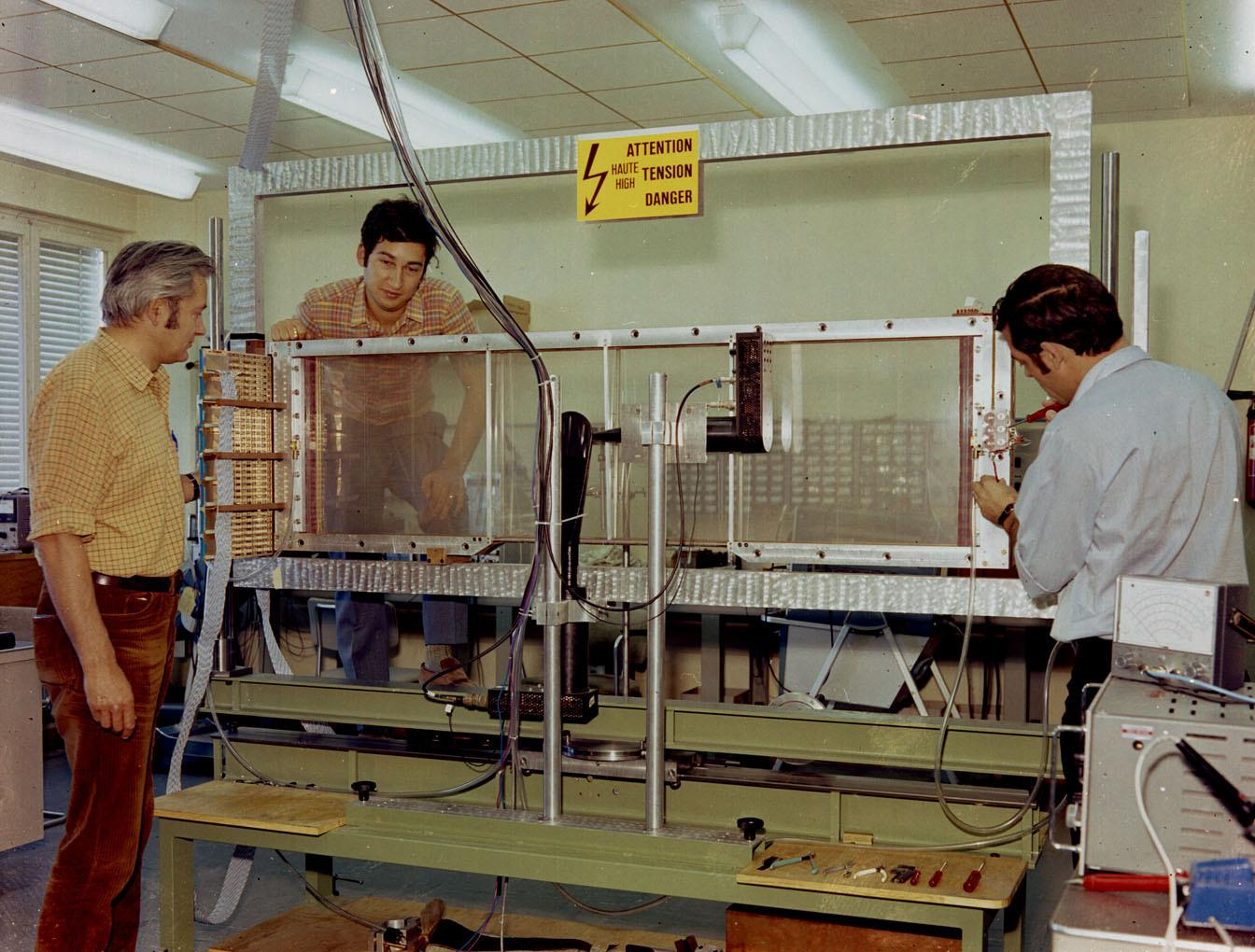
Georges Charpak and his multiwire chamber

== Scientific achievements ==
In 1959, Charpak joined the staff of CERN (European Organization for Nuclear Research) in Geneva, where he invented and developed the multiwire proportional chamber. The chamber was patented and quickly superseded the old bubble chambers, allowing for better data processing. This new creation had been made public during 1968. Charpak was later to become a joint inventor with Nlolc and Policarpo of the scintillation drift chamber during the latter parts of the 1970s. He retired from CERN in 1991.

In 1980, Georges Charpak became professor-in-residence at École supérieure de physique et de chimie industrielles in Paris (ESPCI) and held the Joliot-Curie Chair there in 1984. This is where he developed and demonstrated the powerful applications of the particle detectors he invented, most notably for enabling better health diagnostics. He was the co-founder of a number of start-up in the biolab arena, including Molecular Engines Laboratories, Biospace Instruments and SuperSonic Imagine – together with Mathias Fink. He was elected to the French Academy of Sciences on 20 May 1985.

Georges Charpak received the High Energy Particle Physics Prize of the European Physical Society in 1989 (the first edition of the prize) "for the development of detectors: multiwire proportional chambers, drift chambers and several other gaseous detectors, and their applications in other fields".

Georges Charpak was awarded the Nobel Prize in Physics in 1992 "for his invention and development of particle detectors, in particular the multiwire proportional chamber", with affiliations to both École supérieure de physique et de chimie industrielles (ESPCI) and CERN. In 1999, Charpak received the Golden Plate Award of the American Academy of Achievement. In the French village Saint-Genis-Pouilly—located directly opposite the CERN "campus", there is a street named in his honor.

== Publications ==
=== Books ===
- La vie à fil tendu, co-authored with Dominique Saudinos (1993 Odile Jacob, ISBN 2-7381-0214-X)
- Devenez sorciers, devenez savants, co-authored with Henri Broch (Odile Jacob, ISBN 90-5814-005-9). Published in English as "Debunked!" by the Johns Hopkins University Press.

=== Technical reports ===
- Charpak, G. & M. Gourdin. "The K^{0}K̅^{0} System", European Organization for Nuclear Research, Paris University, (July 11, 1967).
- Charpak, G. "Evolution of Some Particle Detectors Based On the Discharge in Gases", European Organization for Nuclear Research, (November 19, 1969).
- Charpak, G.; Sauli, F. (1973). "High-accuracy, two-dimensional read-out in multiwire proportional chambers". Nuclear Instruments and Methods. 113 (3): 381–385. Bibcode:1973NucIM.113..381C. doi:10.1016/0029-554X(73)90503-X. OSTI 4364786.
- Charpak, G.; Jeavons, A.; Sauli, F. & R. Stubbs, "High-Accuracy Measurements of the Centre of Gravity of Avalanches in Proportional Chambers", European Organization for Nuclear Research, (September 24, 1973).
- Crittenden, J.A.; Hsiung, Y.B.; Kaplan, a.D.M.; Hubbard, J.R.; Mangeot, P.; Peisert, A.; Charpak, G.; Sauli, F.; Brown, C.N.; Childress, S.; et al. (1986). "Inclusive hadronic production cross sections measured in proton-nucleus collisions at √s = 27. 4 GeV". Physical Review D. 34 (9): 2584–2600. Bibcode:1986PhRvD..34.2584C. doi:10.1103/PhysRevD.34.2584. OSTI 7244218. PMID 9957451.

== See also ==
- List of Jewish Nobel laureates
- History of ESPCI Paris
