= Baby sling =

Fabric item designed to carry a child on the body

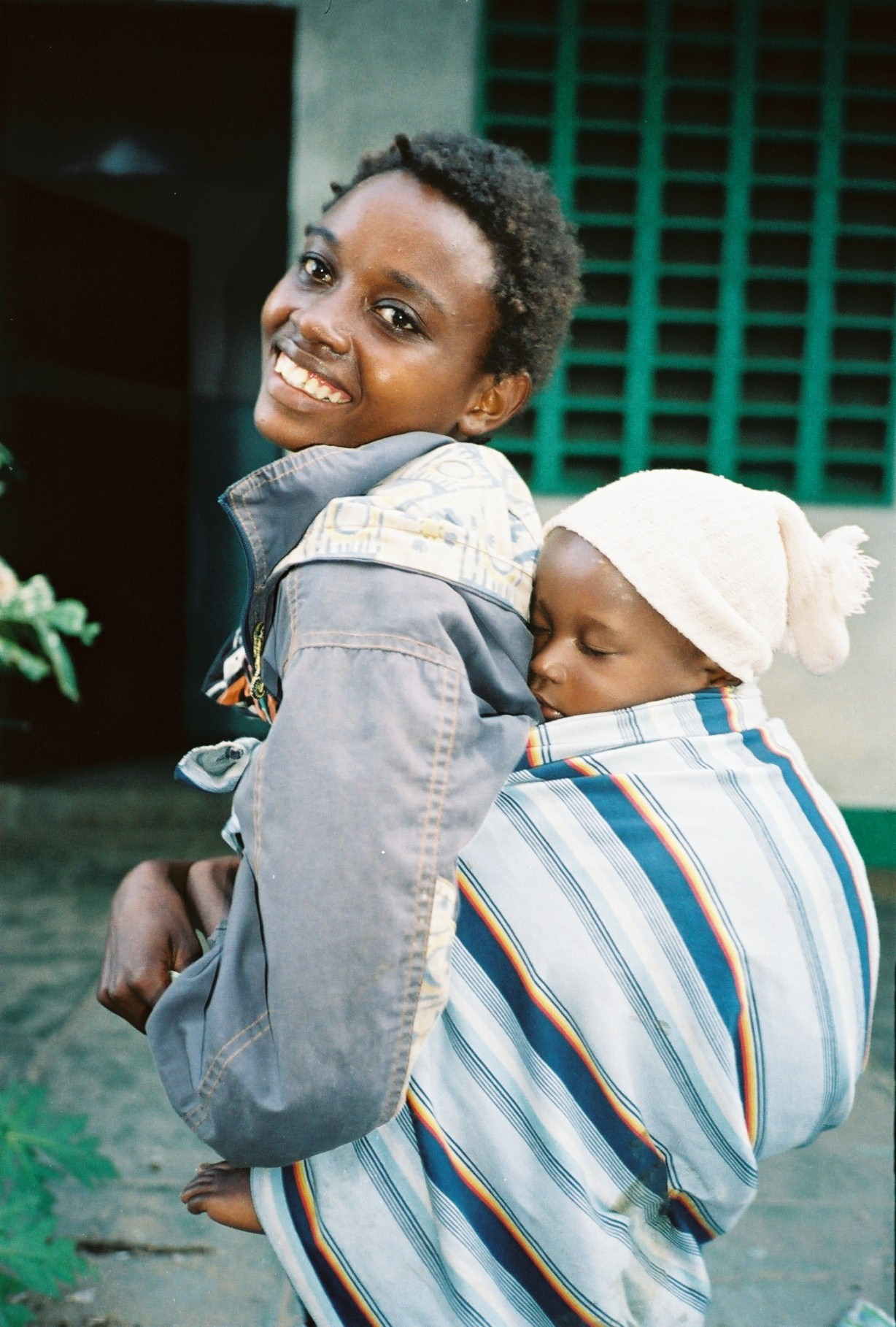
Woman carrying a child in a baby sling

A baby sling or baby carrier is a cloth device, usually of adjustable length, used to carry a baby securely against the carrier's body. Slings have been used for millennia. They are usually made of soft fabric, and wrap around the carrier's chest. Slings provide comfort and support for the baby and allow the parent or carer to keep their hands free as they go about their everyday tasks.

There are a wide variety of carriers available from wraps and ring slings to soft structured carriers and mei tais.

The use of a baby sling has been called babywearing.

== Types ==
=== Ring slings ===
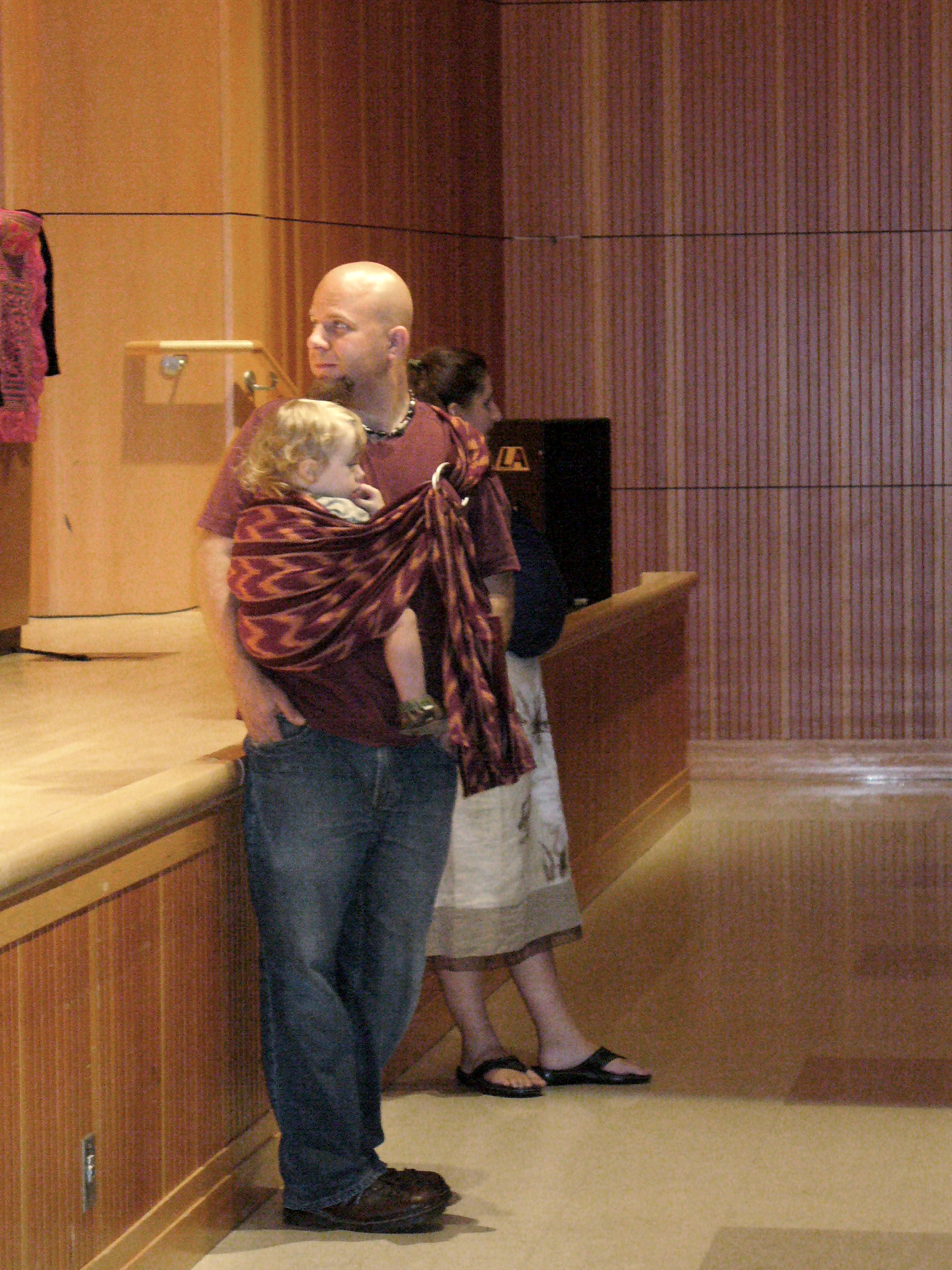
Man wearing child in a ring sling

These are baby carriers that use dynamic tension, a length of cloth and metal (such as aluminum) or nylon rings. One end of the cloth is sewn to two rings. The cloth wraps around the wearer's body from shoulder to opposite hip and back up to the shoulder, and the end is threaded through the rings to create a buckle effect. The baby sits or lies in the resulting pocket. Once a sling is threaded, it can be taken off and put back on without rethreading. A threaded sling forms a loop of cloth. The wearer can put one arm and the head through the loop of cloth to put the sling back on.

When the baby is in the carrier, the baby's weight puts tension on the fabric, and the combination of fabric tension, friction of fabric surfaces against each other and the rings combine to "lock" the sling in position. This type of sling can adjust to different wearers' sizes and accommodate different wearing positions easily. The wearer supports the baby's weight with one hand and uses the other hand to pull more fabric through the rings to tighten or loosen the sling.

Ring slings may be padded or unpadded at the shoulder, have padded or unpadded edges or "rails", and the "tail" of the sling may be open or closed. Some "hybrid" ring slings have curved seats sewn into the body, similar to the seam in a pouch. Ring slings are most closely related in use to the Mexican rebozo, the rings take the place of the knot.

Variation is also found in how the rings attach to the cloth, commonly referred to as "shoulder style". Basic shoulder styles include gathered, pleated, "hot dog" or "center fold", pouch-style (folded in half) and many variations.

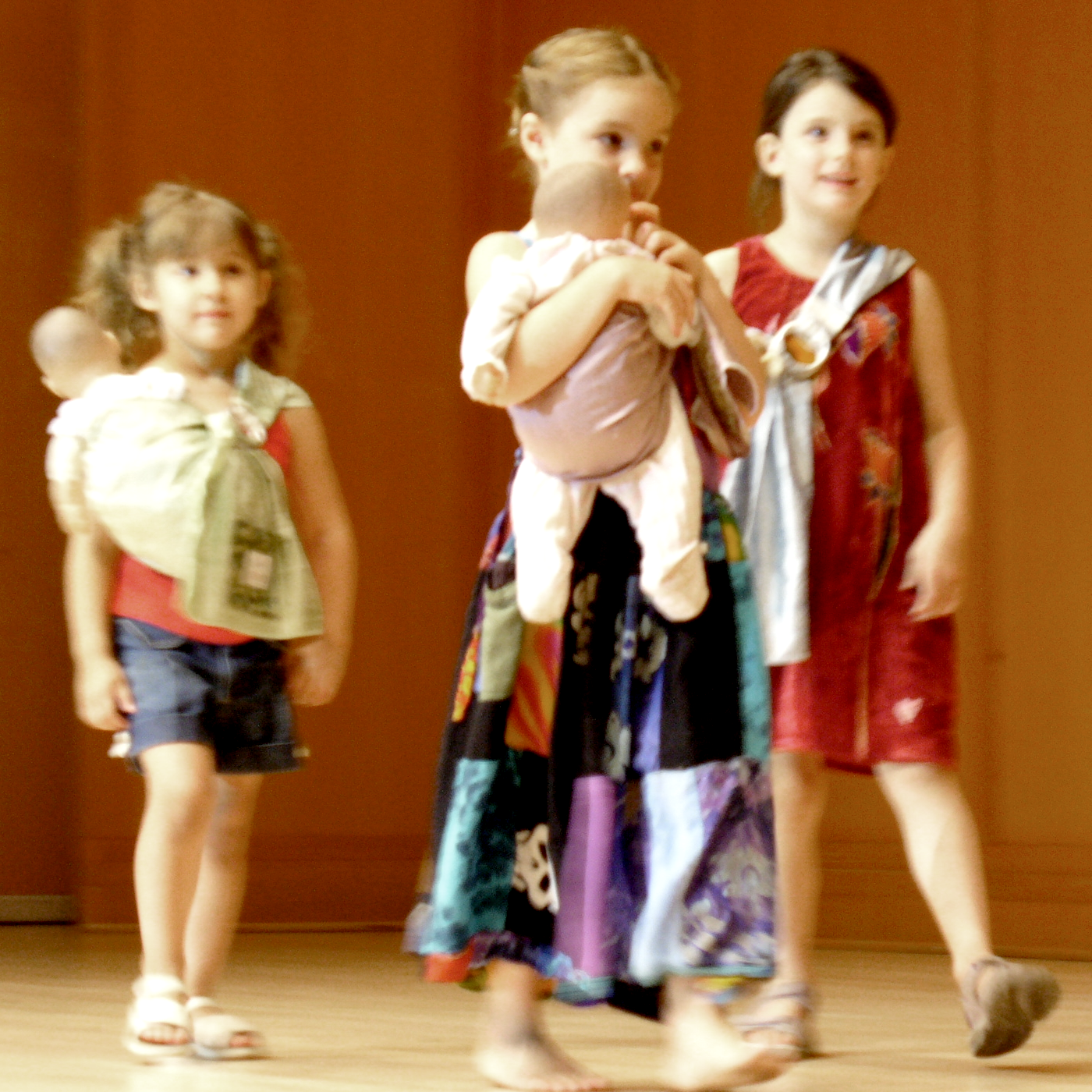
Sisters wearing baby dolls in play slings

Ring slings are highly adaptable and most care givers can wear a "one size fits most" size. As long as the tail is about 8" long a ring sling is still considered safe. Tail length is decided by personal preference with most preferring the tail to hit about hip or mid thigh.

The recommended maximum weight limit for wearing baby in a ring sling is up to 35lbs.

=== Pouch slings ===
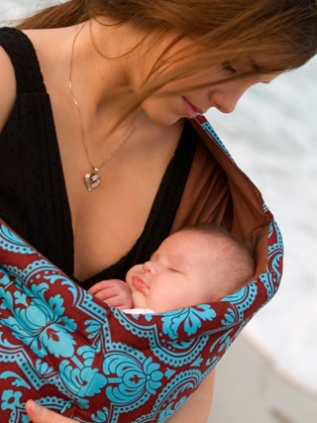
A woman with a baby in a pouch sling

Sometimes called "tube", "pocket" or "ringless" slings, these are generally formed by a wide piece of fabric sewn into a tubular shape. Simple, or fitted pouches do not have rings or other hardware. Adjustable pouches may adjust with zippers, snaps, buckles, clips, rings, drawstrings, Velcro, and other methods. Most pouches have a curve sewn in to shape the cloth to the parent's body and hold the baby more securely than a simple straight tube. The wearer slips the pouch over the head and one shoulder, sash-style, creating a pocket or seat to hold the baby in. Many paediatricians and baby-wearing experts do not recommend pouch slings because babies can suffocate when held incorrectly. Suffocation risk is greatest in newborns and infants under six months, and usually occurs because the baby's chin is collapsed against his or her chest, constricting the airway. Pouch slings also often restrict the parent's view of their child, making suffocation more likely. When using a pouch sling, wearers should be sure to keep the baby's face elevated and clearly visible.

=== Wraps ===
Wraps (sometimes called "wraparounds" or "wraparound slings") are lengths of fabric (usually between 2 metres and 6 metres, or 2.5–7 yards long, and 15–30 inches wide, 38-76 cm), which are wrapped around both the baby and the wearer and then tied. There are different carrying positions possible with a wrap, depending on the length of the fabric. A baby or toddler can be carried on the wearer's front, back or hip. With shorter wraps it is possible to do a one-shouldered carry, similar to those done with a pouch or a ring sling, although most carries involve the fabric going over both shoulders of the wearer and often around the waist to offer maximum support.

There are two main types of wrap—stretchy and woven. Stretchy wraps are generally made of knits such as jersey or interlock. It is easy to take babies in and out of a stretchy wrap. This can be easier for the wearer as the sling often remains tied on and the baby is lifted out and put back in as required. Several factors influence stretchiness: carriers with any spandex or lycra content will tend to be very stretchy, carriers which are 100% cotton or other natural fibers will tend to have less lengthwise stretch. Woven wraps are pieces of woven fabric of varying thickness. Natural fibers are usually chosen, with cotton being the most common, but hemp, linen, silk and wool are also used. A variety of weaves are used. Most common are homespun or handwoven fabrics with simple over-under weaves, twills and jacquards. Most weaves provide some give or stretch diagonally.

=== Simple pieces of cloth ===
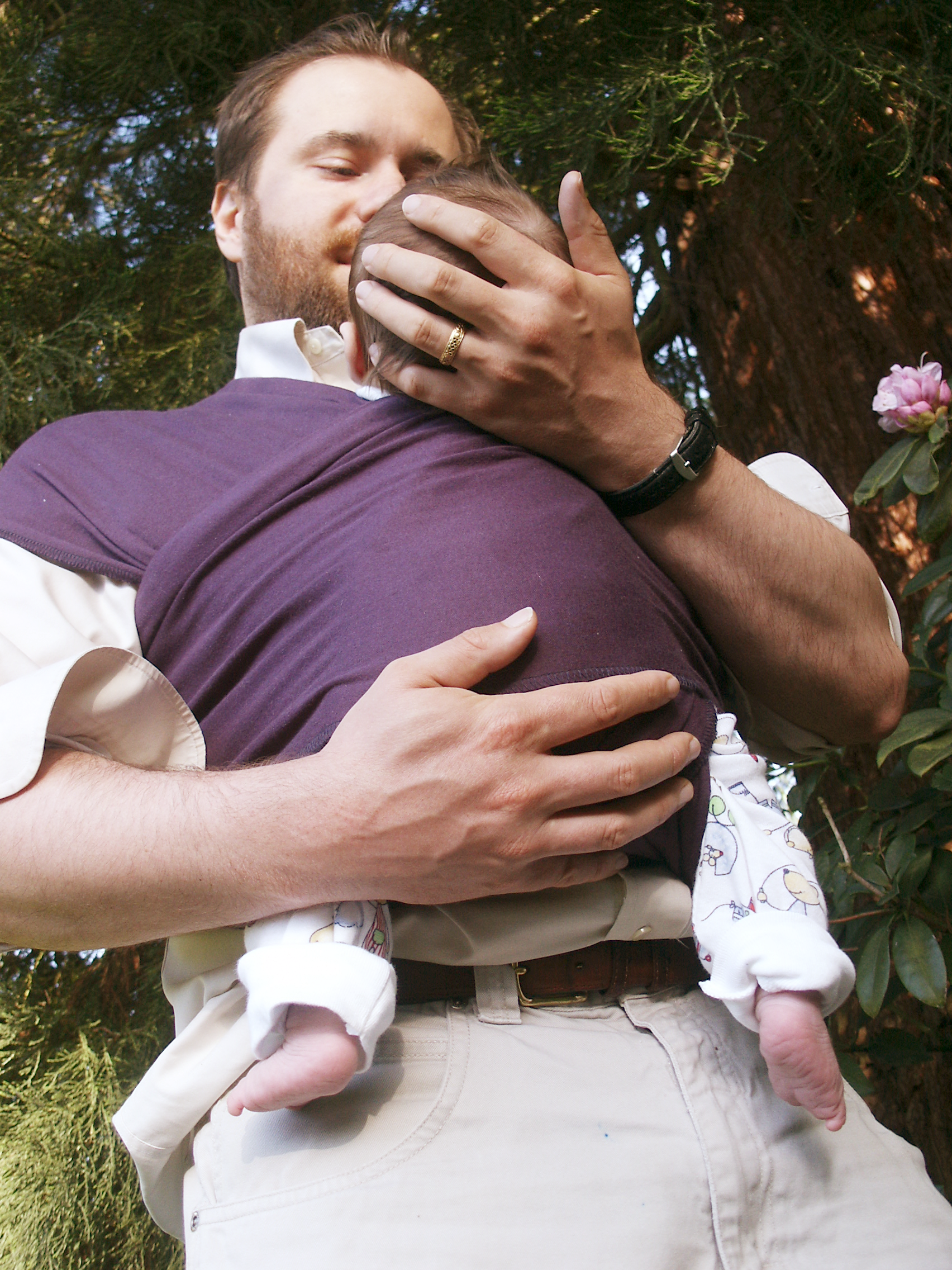
Man wearing baby in a homemade stretchy wrap sling

Pieces of cloth can be turned into slings by wrapping the fabric around the carrier and the baby and either tying it with knots or using a twist and tuck method to secure the ends. Rebozos (Mexico), mantas (Peru), kangas (Africa) and selendangs (Indonesia) are all rectangular pieces of cloth but are tied or wrapped in many different ways. Wraps are also simple pieces of cloth.

=== The podaegi and other Asian-style baby carriers ===
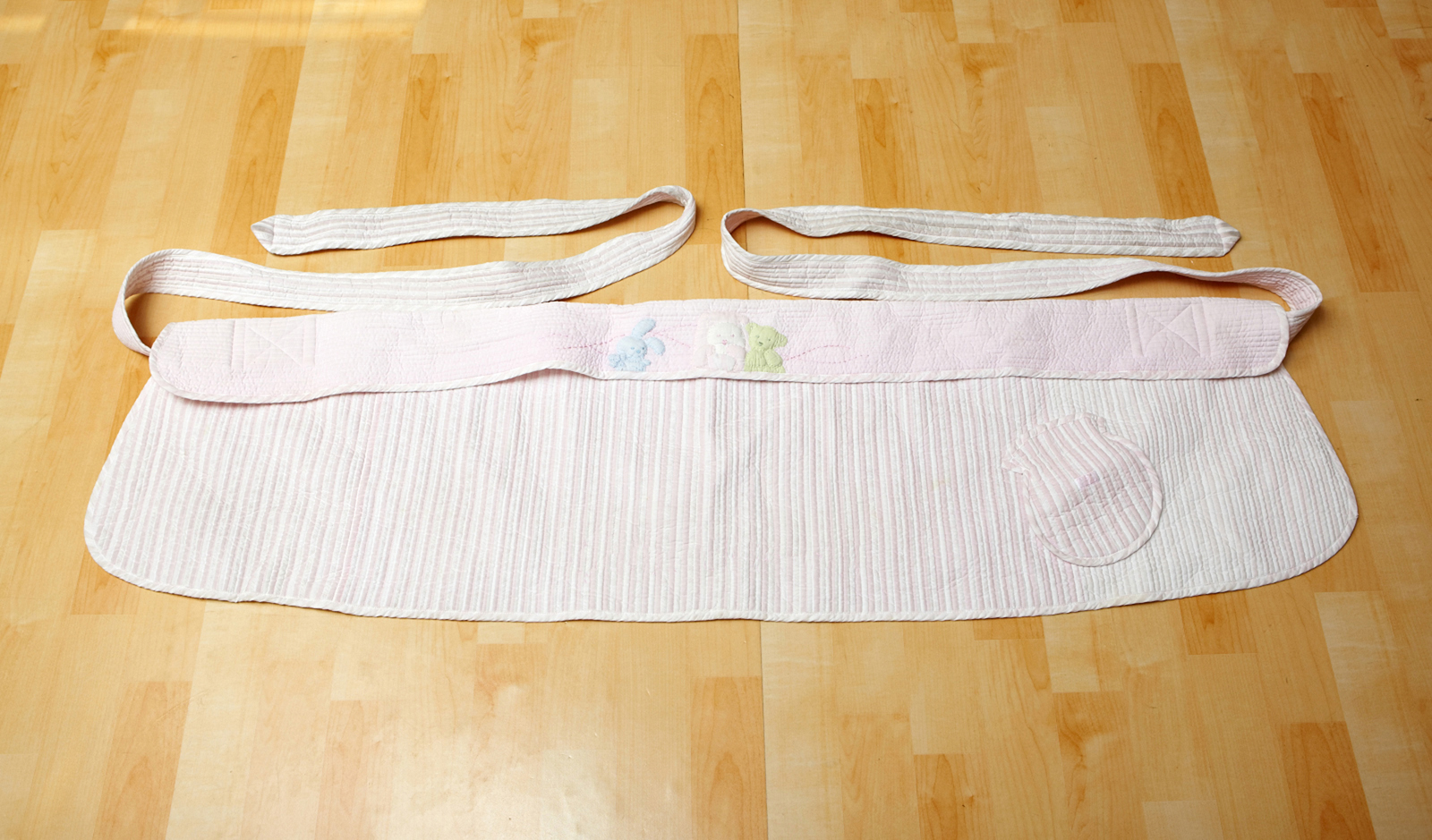
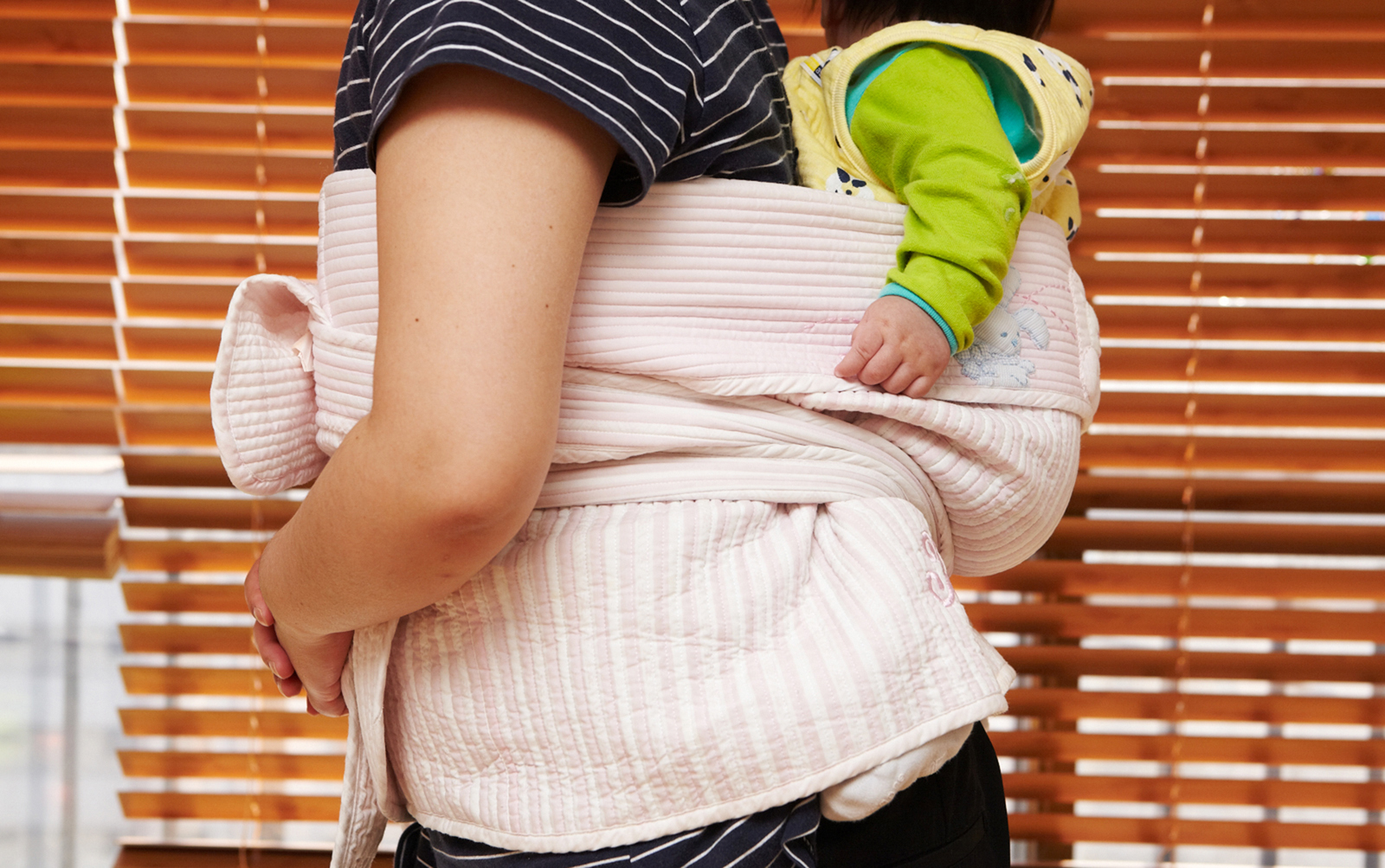
Podaegi (Korean baby sling)

The podaegi (Korean: 포대기, also spelled podegi) is a Korean carrier with a medium to large rectangle of fabric hanging from a very long strap. Traditionally the rectangle is quilted for warmth and wraps around the mother's torso, while the straps are wrapped snug under the baby's bottom and tied around to the front to support and secure the baby on the mother's back. Western interest in the podaegi style has led to new wrapping methods which do go over the shoulders, and to narrower "blankets". Variants of this shape include the Iu-Mienh/Hmong carrier and the Chinese bei bei. Iu-Mienh/Hmong carriers and bei beis are both customarily used with over-the-shoulder wrapping and often have stiff sections which help provide head support or block wind.

The Chinese Mei-tai (Chinese: 背带, Cantonese pronunciation) - meaning mei: to carry on the shoulders / tai: strap, band - is a square or nearly square piece of cloth with parallel unpadded straps emerging from the sides of each corner. It was traditionally secured by bringing all the straps together in a twist with the ends tucked. A variation on the traditional mei tai was popularized in Australia in the 1960s. There are now hundreds of different brands of mei tai available with a variety of features, but the longer straps, taller body and wrap-style tying method are found in almost all of them. Mei tais are suitable for front or back carries with children ranging from birth to as heavy as a parent can support.

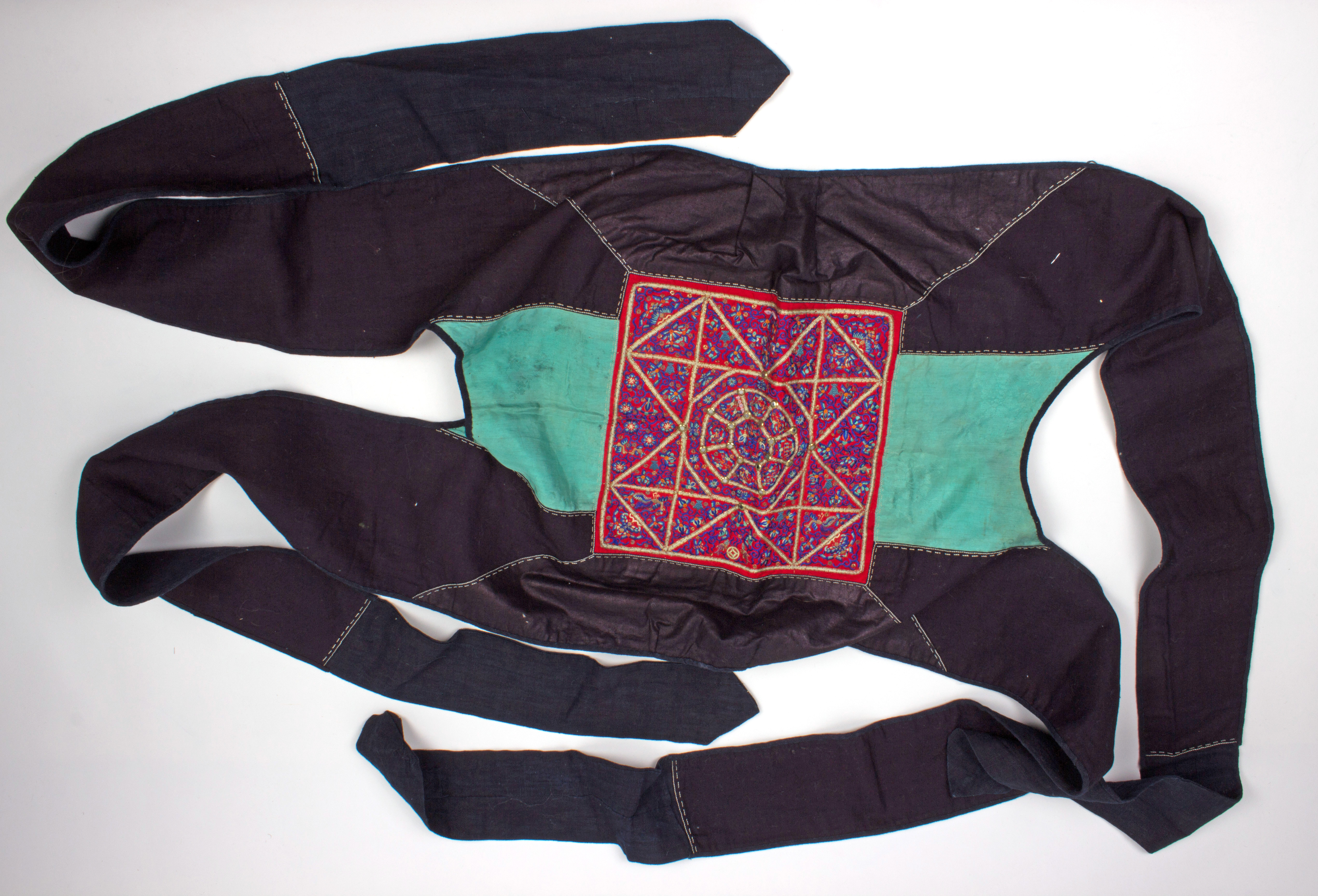
Mei tai carrier

Traditional babywearing in Japan was done with a wrap carry, using an obi. In the 1940s, a carrier known as the onbuhimo became popular. Similar to the Hmong and Mei tai carriers, the onbuhimo has long top straps and a rectangular body. But at the bottom of the rectangle, loops or rings allow the top straps to be threaded through and tightened, while the straps are tied at the waist. The body is much smaller than the bodies of most mei tais and other Asian-style carriers, and the onbuhimo is traditionally used on the back. Variations may have stiff headrests or padding in the body.

Variations of these basic shapes can be found elsewhere in the world. Mei-tai-like carriers were used in places as diverse as Sweden and Africa.

=== Other types of slings and baby carriers ===
Modern structured hip carriers, soft structured carriers (known as SSC) which can be used on front or back, structured front packs and hard-framed backpacks are also used. Hip carriers may be closely related to ring slings or they may be more closely related to a mei tai, and several different types of fasteners are used in different models. Most soft structured carriers are loosely based on the traditional mei tai with a main flat panels and four straps which are shortened and fitted with buckles for added convenience.

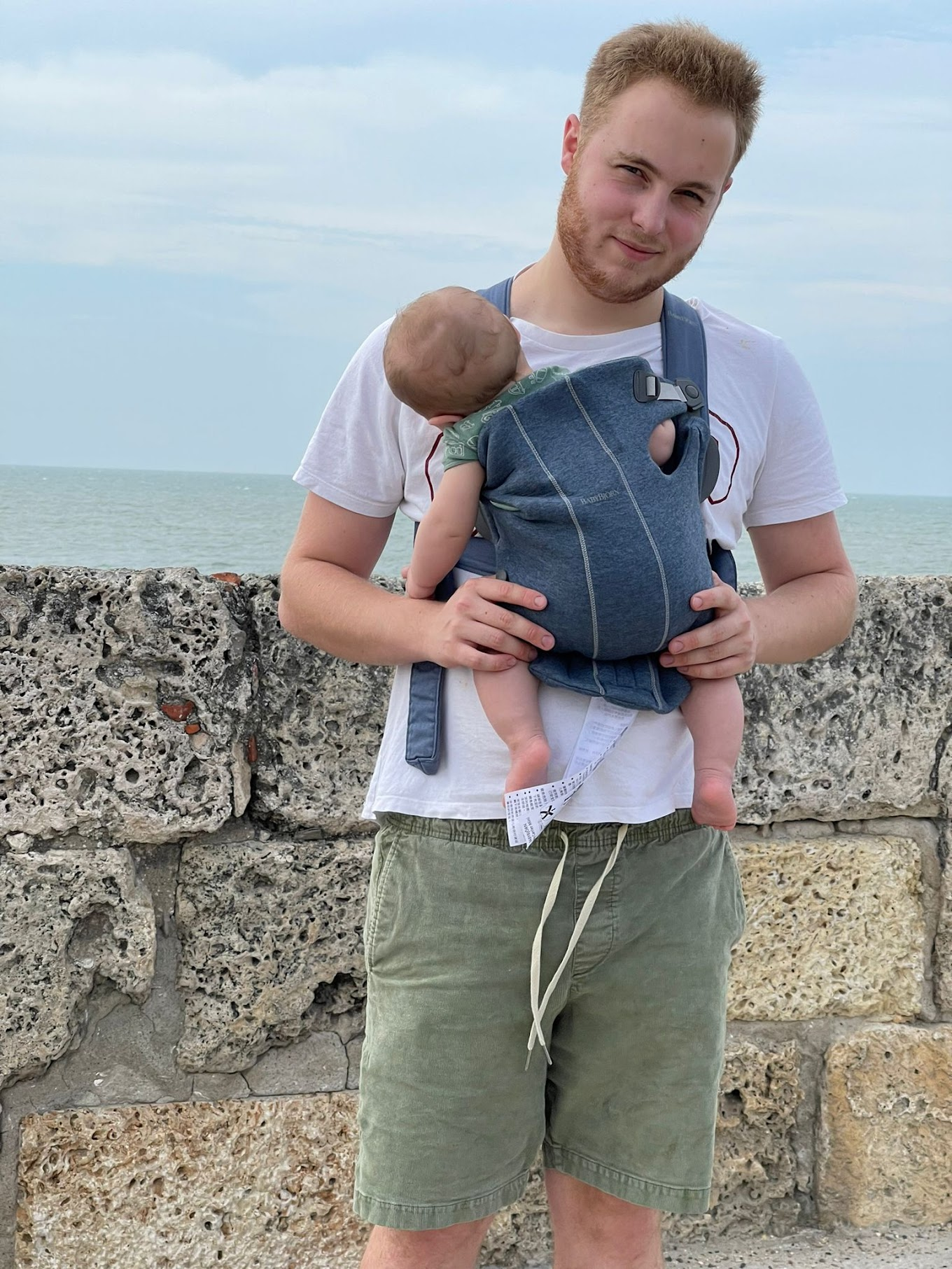
A father wearing an infant in a front-carry position using a soft structured baby carrier.

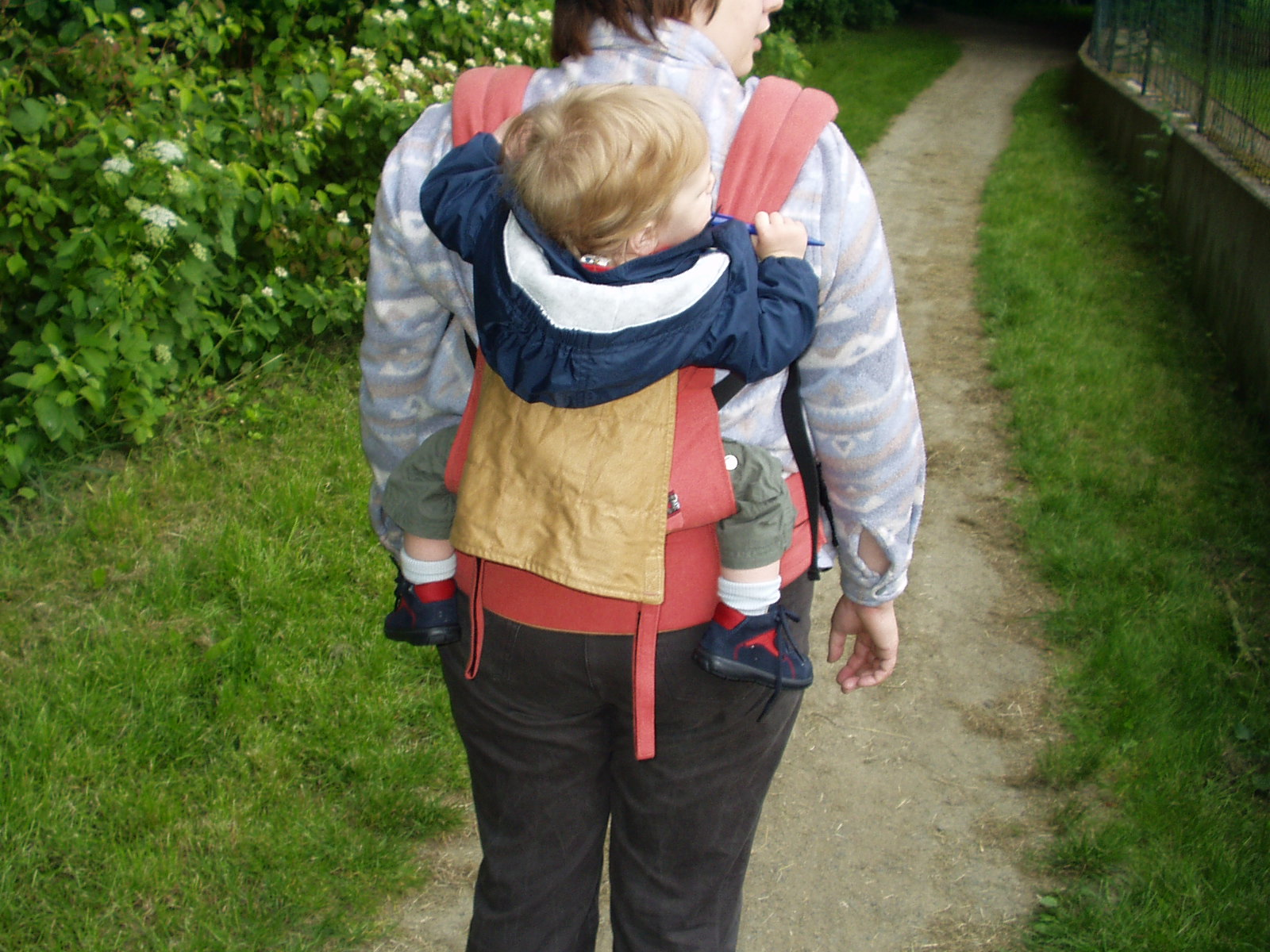
Woman wears an ERGO baby carrier on her back, a popular brand of soft structured carrier.

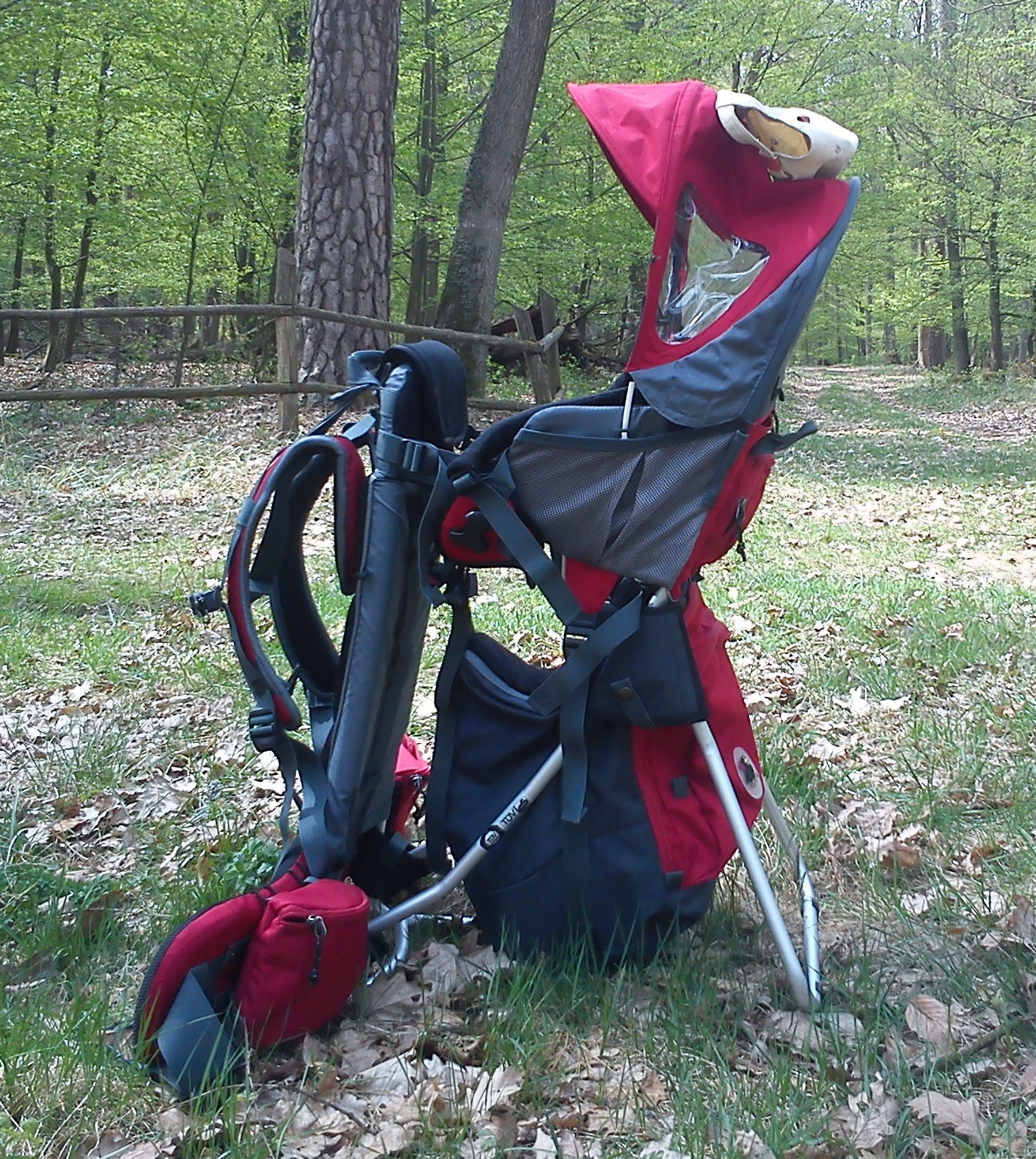
Hard-framed backpack baby carrier

== History ==
Traditionally, baby slings and carriers were simply adaptations of whatever a culture normally used to carry anything heavy. Baskets, calabashes, animal skins, and wooden carrying structures have all been adapted to carry infants and children. Korean mothers continue to use Podaegi to carry children. Inuit mothers continue to use the packing parka or amauti to carry children. In the west, this phenomenon has resulted in a variety of carriers based on camping backpacks. One design, used in New Guinea, resembles a small Mayan-style hammock, in which an infant or child is either carried in a net on the back of an adult, or hung on a tree branch or house beam. Historical photographs of indigenous peoples show babies worn in sashes, baskets and nets hung from the parent's forehead. Cradleboards and carriers hung from one shoulder like a purse have also been documented in several cultures.

== Positions ==
A baby can be placed in various positions while being carried in a baby sling or carrier. These include the vertical position, kangaroo carry, front carry, hip carry, and back carry. Cradle hold, previously considered a carry position, has been proven unsafe and unsuitable for use.

== Risks ==
There have been incidents of babies suffocating while in carriers, particularly "bag sling" styles, and Consumer Reports urged a recall of all slings of this type in 2009. Consumer Reports recommends soft infant carriers (mei tai or soft structured carriers) and backpack baby carriers over these styles. Advocates argue that other types of slings are safe, especially when the baby's face, nose, and mouth are visible at all times.

After a six-week-old baby died while being breastfed "hands-free" in a sling as the mother moved around the house, an inquest heard that the baby was in an unsafe position too far down the sling, and collapsed after five minutes. Despite immediate resuscitation attempts he died three days later. The coroner called for industry standards promoting the safe use of slings, and said that there did not appear to be helpful images, or guidance or advice, of safe and unsafe sling postures. There was no advice that breastfeeding a young baby hands-free risked suffocation.

== Safety measures ==
Using an infant sling requires correct positioning to prevent suffocation and falls. The U.S. Consumer Product Safety Commission (CPSC) mandates federal safety standards for slings to prevent structural failures and falls. Health Canada and the American Academy of Pediatrics (AAP) warn that infants under four months, premature babies, and those with respiratory illnesses face the highest suffocation risk. Sling use is not recommended during activities involving heat, speed, or balance hazards, such as cooking and cycling.

The Consortium of UK Sling Manufacturers and Retailers created the TICKS (Tight, In view at all times, Close enough to kiss, Keep chin off the chest, Supported back) protocol for safe positioning. The sling must be tight enough to hold the baby upright. Loose fabric allows the baby to slump, which restricts breathing. The caregiver must always see the baby's face by looking down. The baby must sit high enough on the chest and the baby's chin must point up and away from their chest to keep the airway open. Sling must support the baby's back so their chest and abdomen rest flat against the caregiver.
