= Kangaroo care =

Technique of newborn care

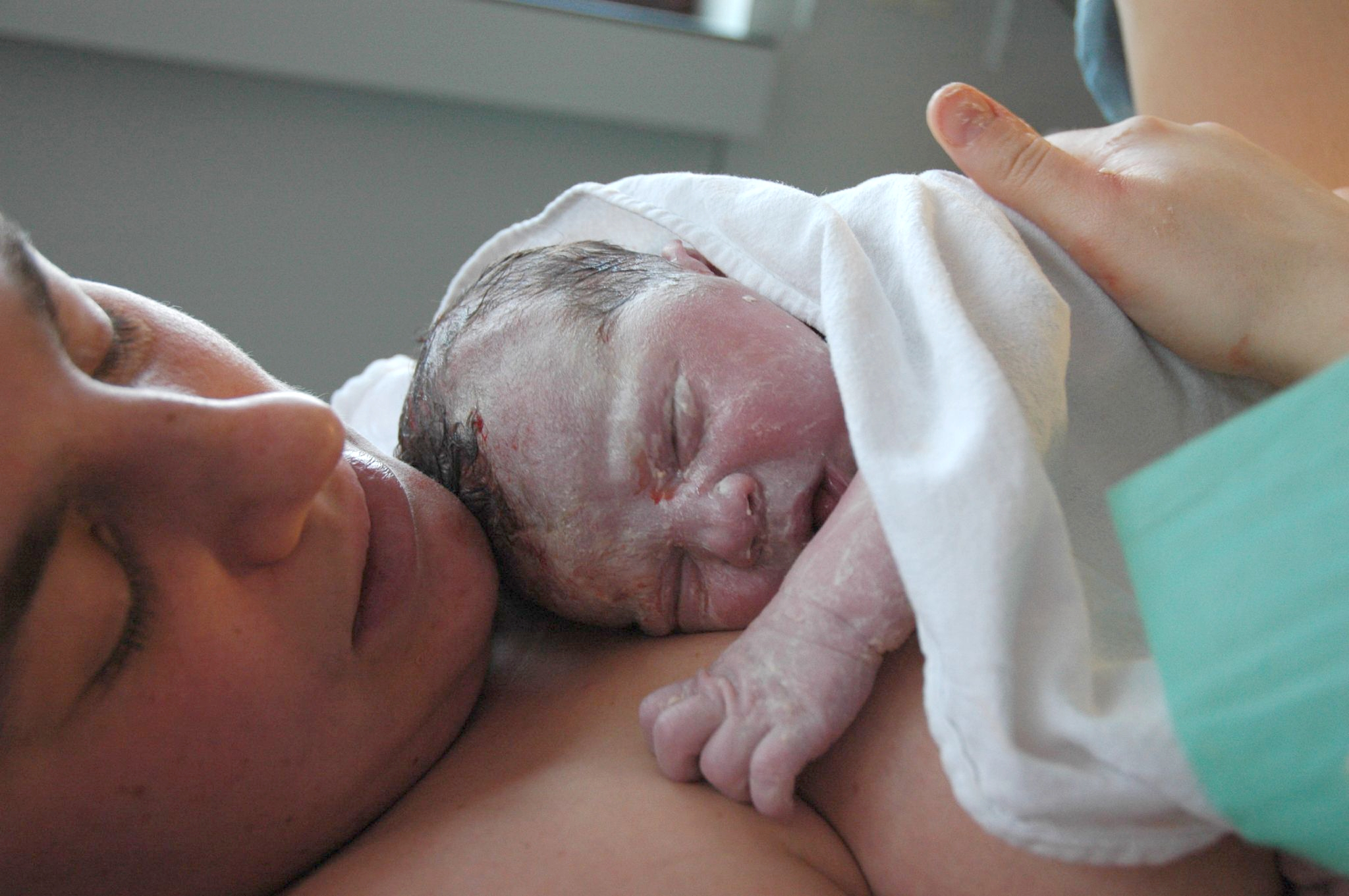
A mother providing kangaroo care immediately following birth

Kangaroo mother care (KMC), which involves skin-to-skin contact (SSC), is an intervention to care for premature or low birth weight (LBW) infants. The technique and intervention is the recommended evidence-based care for LBW infants by the World Health Organization (WHO) since 2003.

In the 2003 WHO Kangaroo Mother Care practical guide, KMC is defined as a "powerful, easy-to-use method to promote the health and well-being of infants born preterm as well as full-term", with its key components being:

- Early, continuous, and prolonged SSC between the mother and the baby;
- Exclusive breastfeeding (ideally);
- Initiated in a hospital setting and can be continued at home;
- Allows for early discharge of the baby to the family;
- After discharge, includes close followup

The early KMC technique was first presented by Rey and Martinez in 1983, in Bogotá, Colombia, where it was developed as an alternative to inadequate and insufficient incubator care for those preterm newborn infants who had overcome initial problems and required only to feed and grow. Decades of research and development, much from researchers from emerging economies, has improved upon the initial work and has documented that modern evidence-based KMC lowers infant mortality and the risk of hospital-acquired infection, increases weight gain of infants, increases rates of breastfeeding, protects neuromotor and brain development of infants, and improves mother-infants bonding, among other benefits. Today, the WHO recommends "Kangaroo mother care (KMC) for preterm or low-birth-weight infants should be started as soon as possible after birth" based on "high-certainty evidence".

== Scientific documentation of benefits ==
Originally babies who were eligible for KMC included LBW infants weighing less than 2,000 grams (4 lb 7 oz) and breathing and eating independently. Cardiopulmonary monitoring, oximetry, supplemental oxygen or nasal ventilation (continuous positive airway pressure), intravenous infusions, and monitor leads do not prevent KMC. In fact, babies who are in KMC tend to be less prone to apnea and bradycardia and have stabilization of oxygen needs.

KMC has been shown to provide many benefits to the infant, as well as to the family directly involved in the infant's care. Large reviews of the thousands of scientific articles that present the body of evidence have been published, that serve as the bases for practical guides for practitioners.

After initial reviews of scientific evidence in the mid-1990s highlighted research ongoing in both developed and developing countries, research into KMC grew exponentially. Systematic reviews of hundreds of scientific articles have documented the impact of KMC on mortality, morbidity, and quality of survival LBW infants.

A randomized controlled trial published in 2016 reported that babies born between 1,500 and 2,200 grams (3 lb 5 oz and 4 lb 14 oz) became physiologically stable in SSC starting from birth, compared to similar babies in incubators. A descriptive study of case series in a hospital without any technical resources evaluated two of the components of the KMC: the inpatient kangaroo position and kangaroo feeding and was published in 1994. This paper supports the hypothesis that, in cases of absence of technical resources, inpatient kangaroo position and nutrition is an acceptable alternative.

In 2016, a Cochrane review, "Kangaroo mother care to reduce morbidity and mortality in low birthweight infants", was published bringing together data from 21 studies including 3,042 LBW babies (less than 1,500 grams (3 lb 5 oz) at birth). This review showed that babies receiving kangaroo care had a reduced risk of death, hospital-acquired infection, and low body temperature (hypothermia); was also associated with increased weight gain, growth in length, and rates of breastfeeding.

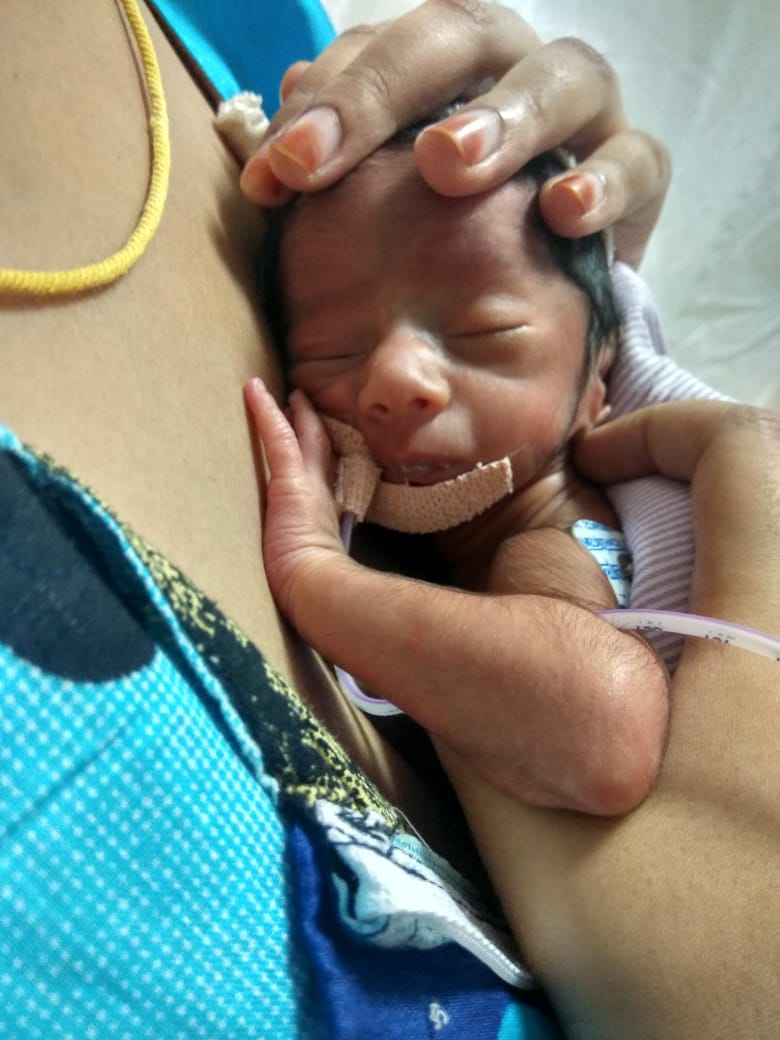
A mother providing kangaroo care to a preterm baby

=== Preterm and LBW infants ===
Kangaroo care "is an effective and safe alternative to conventional neonatal care for LBW infants, mainly in resource-limited countries". KMC reduces mortality, and also morbidity in resource limited settings, though further studies are needed.

Kangaroo care arguably offers the most benefits for preterm and LBW infants, who experience more normalized temperature, heart rate, and respiratory rate, increased weight gain, and fewer hospital-acquired infections. Additionally, studies suggest that preterm infants who experience kangaroo care have improved cognitive development, decreased stress levels, reduced pain responses, normalized growth, and positive effects on motor development. Kangaroo care also helps to improve sleep patterns of infants and may be a good intervention for colic. Earlier discharge from hospital is also a possible outcome Finally, kangaroo care helps to promote frequent breastfeeding and can enhance mother–infant bonding. Evidence from a recent systematic review supports the use of kangaroo mother care as a substitute for conventional neonatal care in settings where resources are limited.

=== For parents ===
Kangaroo care is beneficial for parents because it promotes attachment and bonding, improves parental confidence, and helps to promote increased milk production and breastfeeding success.

A 2017 study found that the psychological benefits of kangaroo care for parents of preterm infants are fairly extensive. Research shows that the use of kangaroo care is linked to lower parental anxiety levels. It was shown to decrease anxiety scores in both mothers and fathers, unrelated to parents' marital status. Kangaroo care has also been shown to lead to greater confidence in parenting skills. Parents who used kangaroo care displayed higher confidence in their ability to care for their child. It has been shown to positively impact breastfeeding as well, with mothers producing larger amounts of milk for longer periods of time.

=== For fathers ===
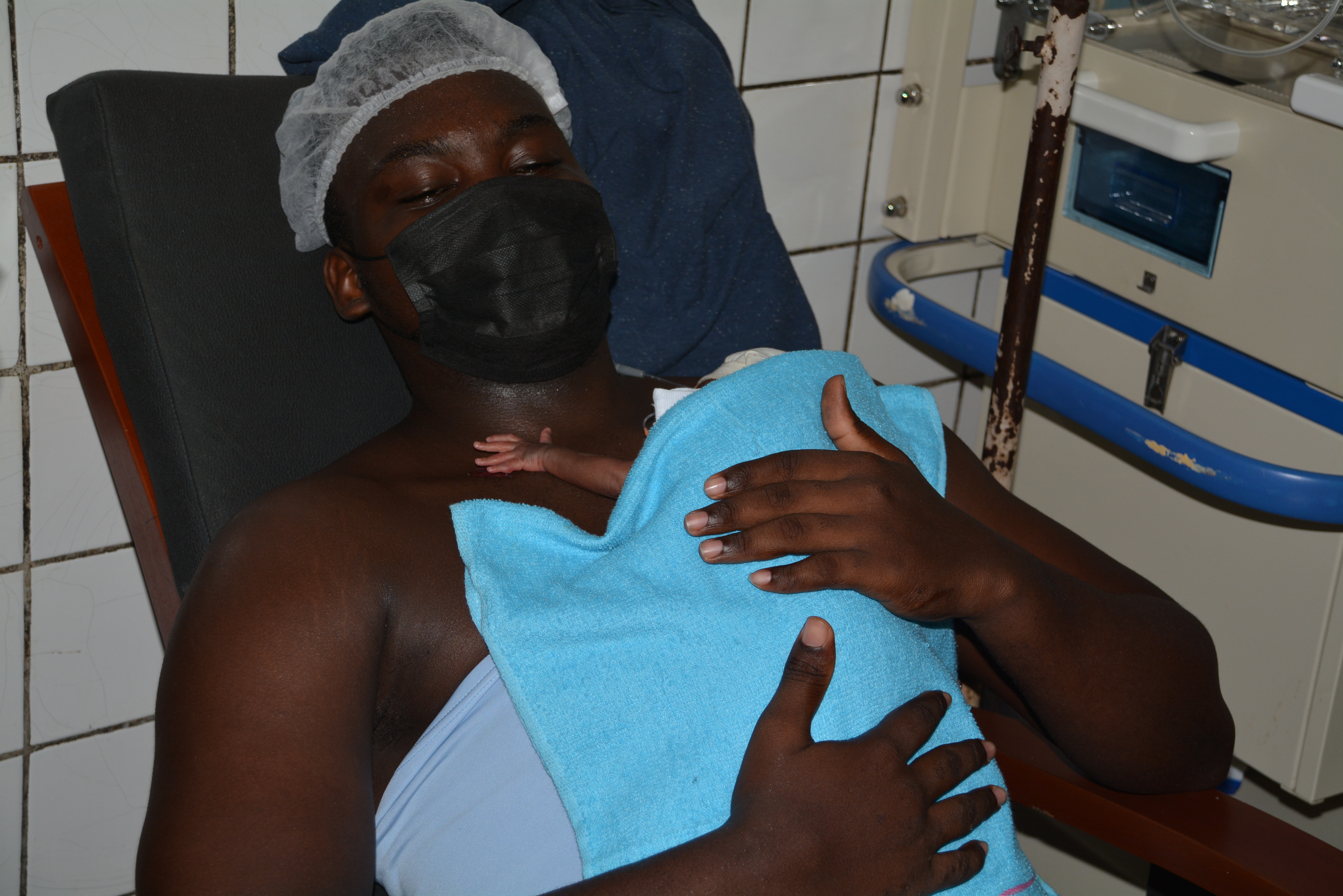
Kangaroo care by father in Cameroon

Both preterm and full term infants benefit from SSC for the first few weeks of life with the baby's father as well. The new baby is familiar with the father's voice, and it is believed that contact with the father helps the infant to stabilize and promotes father to infant bonding. If the infant's mother had a caesarean birth, the father can hold their baby in SSC while the mother recovers from the anesthetic.

A 2016 study looked at international literature reviews of early SSC benefits for infants and fathers. Their findings for infants included:

- Swedish and German reviews found that father SSC is as effective as mother SSC in raising a baby's temperature, and there is no difference between father and mother skin-to-skin on biophysical measures of the baby's expenditure of energy.
- A Swedish review found that babies experiencing father SSC had significantly higher blood glucose levels than babies who were placed in an incubator. A higher glucose level protects a baby from cold temperatures.
- A Swedish review found that babies who experienced father SSC showed lower levels of salivary cortisol when handled, which indicates a lower stress response.
- A Swedish review found that babies receiving father SSC were more easily comforted and stopped crying more quickly than babies that had been separated from a parent.
- A Swedish review found that prefeeding behaviors, such as rooting and sucking, were less frequent among the infants who received father SSC. Infants receiving father SSC started breastfeeding a little later than those receiving SSC only from their mothers.

Looking at the review, researchers found that SSC was of benefit to fathers as well. Their findings included:

- A Colombian study focused on India found that fathers who provided SSC to preterm infants exhibited more caring behaviours and developed a more sensitive approach to their infants.
- A Colombian randomized control trial found that after a pre-term birth, father SSC was linked to better cognitive development of the infant and more engagement by the father when the couple returned to their home.
- Reviews done in the US and Sweden showed that fathers who provided SSC felt less stress, were less anxious, and had a better relationship with the mother.
- Reviews done in Denmark and Sweden found that father SSC, like mother SSC, promotes verbal interaction between infant and parent within minutes of the birth. The review also found that fathers who have experienced SSC participated more in infant care and felt more in control when handling unexpected situations.

=== Following cesarean section birth ===
Although the WHO and UNICEF recommend that infants born by cesarean section should also have SSC as soon as the mother is alert and responsive, a 2014 review of medical literature found that many hospitals were not providing SSC following a C-section. Immediate SSC following a spinal or epidural anesthetic is possible because the mother remains alert; however, after a general anesthetic, the father or other family member may provide SSC until the mother is able.

It is known that, during the hours of labor before a vaginal birth, a woman's body begins to produce oxytocin which aids in the bonding process, and the authors believe that SSC can be of special importance following a C-section birth. Indeed, women reported that they felt that SSC had helped them to feel close to and bond with their infant. The review reported comments made by mothers such as "My baby calms down right away when I put him to my chest. I don't know if it's related to holding him skin‐to‐skin during the cesarean—but I think it is." Newborns were also found to cry less and relax quicker when they had SSC with their father as well. There is evidence that women who give birth by C-section are less likely to breastfeed and those that do have increased difficulties in establishing breastfeeding. The review, however, found that immediate or early SSC increased the likelihood of successful breastfeeding.

=== Promotes breastfeeding ===
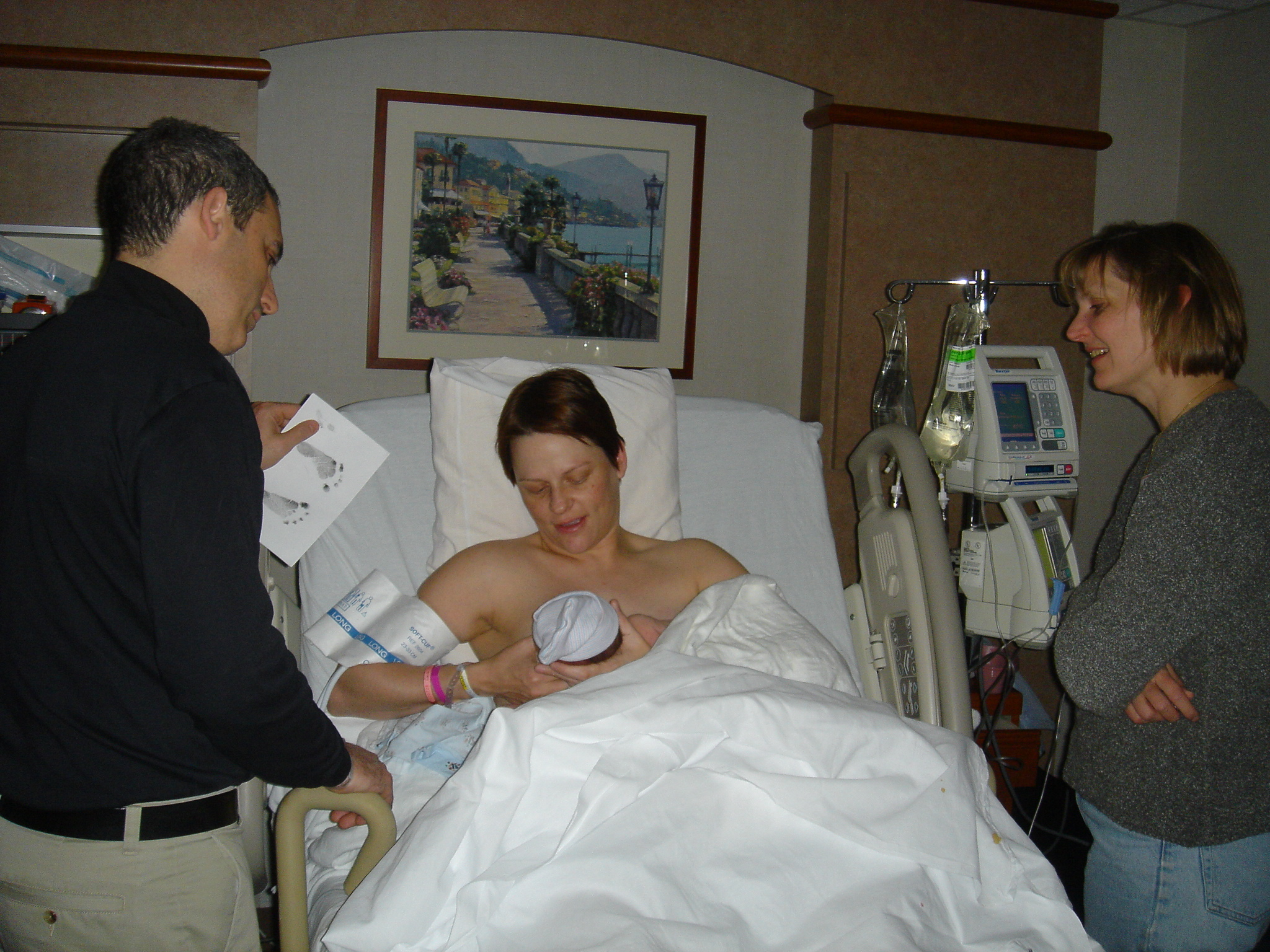
Infant nursing shortly after birth

According to some authorities, there is a growing body of evidence that suggests that early SSC of mother and baby stimulates breastfeeding behavior in the baby. Newborn infants who are immediately placed on their mother's skin have a natural instinct to latch on to the breast and start nursing, typically within one hour of being born. It is thought that immediate SSC provides a form of imprinting that makes subsequent feeding significantly easier. The WHO reports that, in addition to more successful breastfeeding, SSC between a mother and her newborn baby immediately after delivery also reduces crying, improves mother to infant interaction, and keeps baby warm. According to studies quoted by UNICEF, babies have been observed to naturally follow a unique process which leads to a first breastfeed. After birth, babies who are placed skin to skin on their mothers chest will:

- Initially babies cry briefly—a very distinctive birth cry
- Then, they will enter a stage of relaxation, recovering from the birth
- Then the baby will start to wake up
- Then begin to move, initially little movements, perhaps of the arms, shoulders, and head
- As these movements increase, the baby will actually start to crawl toward the breast
- Once the baby has found the breast and therefore the food source, there is a period of rest. Often, this can be mistaken as the baby is not hungry or wanting to feed
- After resting, the baby will explore and get familiar with the breast, perhaps by nuzzling, smelling, and licking before attaching

Providing that there are no interruptions, all babies are said to follow this process and it is suggested that trying to rush the process or interruptions such as removing the baby to weigh or measure is counterproductive and may lead to problems at subsequent breastfeeds.

For mothers with low milk supply, increasing SSC is recommended, as it promotes more frequent feeding and stimulates the milk ejection reflex, prompting the body to produce more milk.

=== Pain control ===
SSC is effective in reducing pain in infants during painful procedures. There appears to be no difference between mothers and others who provide SSC during medical treatments.

=== KMC as a neuroprotective intervention on the brain development ===
The Kangaroo Foundation research team in partnership with Colombian and Canadian university teams were able to locate and engage almost 200 adults that represent 70% of the randomized cohort of infants that received KMC 20 years earlier. The team performed a cross-sectional evaluation of neurophysiology and neuroimaging with the application of a neuropsychological test battery. Results already published show that KMC should be considered a neuroprotective drug for the immature brain of the premature child. KMC allows a multisensory stimulation (olfactory, auditory, tactile, sensitive, and proprioceptive) that allows this immature brain to grow and connect in the best available condition.

=== For institutions ===
Kangaroo care often results in reduced hospital stays, reduced need for expensive healthcare technology, increased parental involvement and teaching opportunities, and better use of healthcare dollars.

=== Additional evidence for SSC ===
There are a number of early studies on the impact of SSC on the health of all newly born humans, including a 1979 study that showed increased breastfeeding rates when SSC started at birth and when early breastfeeding was encouraged every two hours.

A randomized controlled trial published in 2004 reported that babies born between 1,200 and 2,200 grams (2 lb 10 oz and 4 lb 14 oz) became physiologically stable in SSC starting from birth, compared to similar babies in incubators. In another randomized controlled trial conducted in Ethiopia, survival improved when SSC was started before six hours of age.

In the 1990s, studies began to note a series of innate behaviors in full term infants when placed in SSC with their mothers. One 2011 study described a sequence of nine innate behaviors as:

the birth cry, relaxation, awakening and opening the eyes, activity (looking at the mother and breast, rooting, hand to mouth movements, soliciting sounds), a second resting phase, crawling towards the nipple, touching and licking the nipple, suckling at the breast and finally falling asleep.

It is believed that

this 'sensitive period' predisposes or primes mothers and infants to develop a synchronous reciprocal interaction pattern, provided they are together and in intimate contact. Infants who are allowed uninterrupted SSC immediately after birth and who self-attach to the mother's nipple may continue to nurse more effectively.

A Cochrane review on "Early skin-to-skin contact for mothers and their healthy babies", updated in 2015, provided clinical support for the scientific rationale but looked at evidence for early SSC for healthy babies. The available evidence showed that early SSC was associated with increased rates of breastfeeding, and some evidence of improved physiological outcomes (early stability of the heart rate and breathing) for the babies.

== Technique ==
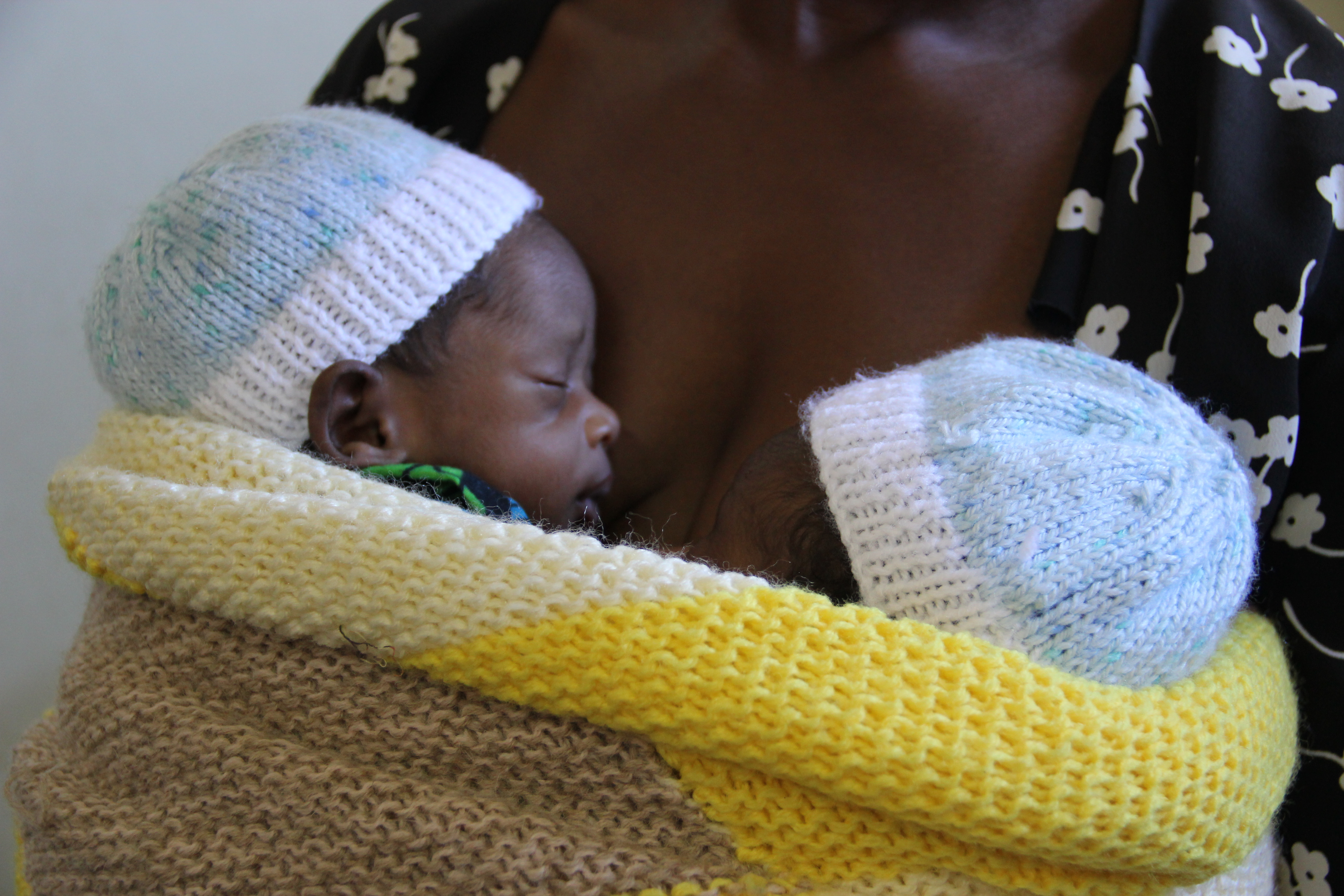
A woman holds her premature twin grandsons skin-to-skin. This position helps babies maintain the proper body temperature.

Kangaroo care seeks to provide restored closeness of the newborn with family members by placing the infant in direct SSC with one of them. This ensures physiological and psychological warmth and bonding. The parent's stable body temperature helps to regulate the neonate's temperature more smoothly than an incubator and allows for readily accessible breastfeeding when the mother holds the baby this way.

While this model of infant care is substantially different from the typical Western neonatal intensive care unit procedures, the two are not mutually exclusive, and it is estimated that more than 200 neonatal intensive care units practice kangaroo care. One survey found that 82% of neonatal intensive care units use kangaroo care in the US.

In kangaroo care, the baby wears only a small diaper and a hat and is placed in a flexed (fetal position) with maximum SSC on parent's chest. The baby is secured with a wrap that goes around the naked torso of the adult, providing the baby with proper support and positioning (maintain flexion), constant containment without pressure points or creases, and protecting from air drafts (thermoregulation). If it is cold, the parent may wear a shirt or hospital gown with an opening to the front and a blanket over the wrap for the baby.

The tight bundling is enough to stimulate the baby: vestibular stimulation from the parent's breathing and chest movement, auditory stimulation from the parent's voice and natural sounds of breathing and the heartbeat, touch by the skin of the parent, the wrap, and the natural tendency to hold the baby. All this stimulation is important for the baby's development.

"Birth Kangaroo Care" places the baby in kangaroo care with the mother within one minute after birth and up to the first feeding. The American Academy of Pediatrics recommends this practice, with minimal disruption for babies that do not require life support. The baby's head must be dried immediately after birth and then the baby is placed with a hat on the mother's chest. Measurements etc. are performed after the first feeding. According to the US Institute of Kangaroo Care, healthy babies should maintain SSC method for about three months so that both baby and mother are established in breastfeeding and have achieved physiological recovery from the birth process.

For premature babies, this method can be used continuously around the clock or for sessions of no less than one hour in duration (the length of one full sleep cycle). It can be started as soon as the baby is stabilized, so it may be at birth or within hours, days, or weeks after birth.

Kangaroo care is different from the practice of babywearing. In kangaroo care, the adult and the baby are skin-to-skin and chest-to-chest, securing the position of the baby with a stretchy wrap, and it is practiced to provide developmental care to premature babies for six months and full-term newborns for three months. In babywearing, the adult and the child are fully clothed, the child may be in the front or back of the adult, it can be done with many different types of carriers and slings, and it is commonly practiced with infants and toddlers.

== Rationale ==
In primates, early SSC is part of a universal reproductive behavior, and early separation is used as a research modality to test the harmful effects on early development. Research suggests that, for all mammals, the maternal environment (or place of care) is the primary requirement for regulation of all physiological needs (homeostasis), maternal absence leads to dysregulation and adaptation to adversity.

In mainstream clinical medicine, KMC is used as an adjunct to advanced technology that requires maternal infant separation. However, SSC may have a better scientific rationale than the incubator. All other supportive technology can be provided as part of care to extremely LBW babies during SSC and appears to produce a better effect.

Based on the scientific rationale, it has been suggested that SSC should be initiated immediately, to avoid the harmful effects of separation (Bergman Curationis). In terms of classification and proper defining for research purposes, the following aspects that categorize and define SSC have been proposed:

- Initiation time, (minutes, hours from birth), ideal is zero separation.
- Dose of SSC, (hours per day, or as percentage of day), ideal >90%.
- Duration, (measured in days or weeks from birth), ideally until infant refuses.

Safe technique should ensure that obstructive apnea cannot occur. Since the mother must be able to sleep to provide adequate dose, this requires keeping the airway safely open, and close containment to mother's bare chest using a garment, various of these are described in the WHO guidelines.

The primary provider of SSC should be the parent or caregiver, but other family members can also be used. Since SSC is basic to early bonding and attachment, it should probably not be done by hospital staff and other surrogates.

== Terminology ==
Kangaroo care is likely the most widely used term in the US for SSC. Gene Cranston Anderson may have been the first to coin the term kangaroo care in the US. The defining feature of this is however for skin-to-skin contact (SSC, or sometimes STS). This is used synonymously with "skin-to-skin care". Nils Bergman, one of the founders of the Kangaroo Mother Care Movement, argues that, since SSC is a place of care, not a kind of care in itself, SSC should be the preferred term.

KMC is a broader package of care defined by the WHO. KMC originally referred only to care of LMW and preterm infants and is defined as a care strategy including three main components: kangaroo position, nutrition, and discharge. Kangaroo position means direct SSC between mother and baby but can include father, other family member, or surrogate. The infant should be upright on the chest, and the airway secured with safe technique. (The term KMC is commonly used to mean SSC, despite its definition from the WHO as including a broader strategy). Kangaroo nutrition implies exclusive breastfeeding, with additional support as required but with the aim of achieving ultimately exclusive breastfeeding. Kangaroo discharge requires that the infant is sent home early, meaning as soon as the mother is breastfeeding and able to provide all basic care herself. In Colombia in 1985, this took place at weights around 1,000 grams (2 lb 3 oz), with oxygen cylinders for home use; the reason was that overcrowding in their hospital meant that three babies in an incubator would result in potentially lethal cross-infections. An essential part of this is close followup and access to daily visits.

== History ==
An early example of skin-to-skin infant care is the traditional Inuit woman's garment, the amauti, had a large pouch at the back where the baby would sit against the mother's bare back. This skin-to-skin approach is also present in many other cultures around the world.

Peter de Chateau in Sweden first described studies of "early contact" with mother and baby at birth in 1976, but the articles do not describe specifically that this was SSC. Klaus and Kennell did very similar work in the US, more well known in the context of early maternal-infant bonding. The first reported use of the term "skin-to-skin contact" is by Thomson in 1979 and quotes the work of de Chateau in its rationale. The inception of Kangaroo Mother Care happens in Bogota, Colombia, which included the use of skin-to-skin as part of a multiprong approach to LBW infant care, together with exclusive breastfeeding, early discharge, among other aspect.

In 1978, due to increasing morbidity and mortality rates in the Instituto Materno Infantil NICU in Bogotá, Colombia, Edgar Rey Sanabria, professor of neonatology at Department of Paediatry National University of Colombia, and the next year Hector Martinez Gomez as coordinator, introduced a method to alleviate the shortage of caregivers and lack of resources. They suggested that mothers have continuous SSC with their premature or LBW babies to keep them warm and to give exclusive breastfeeding as needed. This freed up overcrowded incubator space and care givers.

SSC is the cornerstone of KMC and initially adopted with the goal of thermal regulation. The SSC of the kangaroo position is done in an upright prono position, preferably on the mother, in a frog position and with an elastic support that allows a support of the position at the same time as it allows the child to make small movements as when he was in the womb. It is necessary to ensure the freedom of the respiratory tract, the position is continuous to ensure the thermal regulation or alternates with an incubator if the child or their mother does not tolerate the position anymore. The mother learns to feed the baby at short intervals. As soon as the mother feels able to carry her growing baby and feed it, she can go home with a close monitoring.

Another feature of kangaroo care was early discharge in the kangaroo position despite prematurity. It has proven successful in improving survival rates of premature and low birth weight newborns and in lowering the risks of nosocomial infection, severe illness, and lower respiratory tract disease. It also increased exclusive breastfeeding and for a longer duration and improved maternal satisfaction and confidence.

Rey Sanabria and Martinez Gomez published their results in 1981 in Spanish and used the term "Kangaroo Mother Method". This was brought to the attention of English speaking health professionals in an article by Whitelaw and Sleath in 1985. Gene Cranston Anderson and Susan Ludington were instrumental in introducing this to North America.

In 1989, a group of health professionals, including Nathalie Charpak, began the evaluation and dissemination of KMC in Colombia and began applying a scientific rigorous research approach to demonstrate the safety and effectiveness of KMC. In 1994, they created the Fundacion Canguro o Kangaroo Foundation, which has trained almost a hundred medical teams from more than 50 countries in KMC. The foundation continues to be a center for research, dissemination, and training in KMC.

In 1996, 30 interested researchers convened by Adriano Cattaneo and colleagues in November 1996 in Trieste, Italy, together with the WHO represented by Jelka Zupan, decided to adopt the original term "Kangaroo Mother Care" created by Rey Sanabria in 1978, in Colombia.

An International Network of Kangaroo Mother Care (INK) was convened at the Trieste meeting and has overseen workshops and conferences every two years. After Trieste, meetings were held all over the world every two years, with major support from the Fundacion Canguro. These include: in Bogotá, Colombia, 1998; Yogyakarta, Indonesia, 2000; Cape Town, South Africa, 2002; Rio de Janeiro, Brazil, 2004; Cleveland, US, 2006; Uppsala, Sweden, 2008; Quebec, Canada, 2010; Ahmedabad, India, 2012; Kigali, Rwanda, 2014; Trieste 2016; Bogotá 2018; Manille 2020 (virtual); and Madrid, Spain, 2022. Papers have been published on the results of these workshop, the latest being in 2020.

An informal steering committee coordinates these meetings: (alphabetically, current) Nils Bergman, Adriano Cattaneo, Nathalie Charpak, Juan Gabriel Ruiz, Kerstin Hedberg-Nyqvist, Ochi Ibe, Susan Ludington, Socorro Mendoza, Mantoa Mokrachane, Carmen Pallas, Réjean Tessier, and Rekha Udani.

Susan Ludington maintains a "KC BIB" (bibliography) on behalf of INK, endeavoring to be a complete inventory of any and all publications relevant to KMC. This is also broken down in an analysis of 120 charts, in which specific outcomes are collated.

The International Kangaroo Care Awareness Day has been celebrated worldwide on 15 May since 2011. It is a day to increase awareness to enhance the practice of kangaroo care in NICUS, Post Partum, Labor and Delivery, and any hospital unit that has babies up to three months of age.

== Society and culture ==
The International Kangaroo Care Awareness Day, sometimes referred to as World Kangaroo Care Day, or just Kangaroo Care Day, is celebrated on 15 May since 2011. It is a day to increase awareness, education, and celebration to enhance the practice of kangaroo care/SAC globally. Healthcare professionals, parents, and volunteers around the world show their support, in their own way, for improving kangaroo care practice to benefit babies, parents, and society at large.

World Prematurity Day is observed on 17 November each year to raise awareness of preterm birth and the concerns of preterm babies and their families worldwide. It is also the day to speak about KMC and prematurity and family centered care.

== Controversy ==
The main controversy among proponents of KMC relates to eligibility to initiate kangaroo position: in the original Rey Sanabria–Martinez Gomez model and as described in the WHO guidelines, the infant should be stable to "tolerate skin-to-skin contact".

For the Fundacion Canguro of Bogota, the kangaroo position should be started as soon as possible after birth and for as long as possible until the child can no longer tolerate the position. If the mother cannot carry the child, the father or a family member can replace her temporarily.

From a biological and neuroscience perspective, others argue that it is separation from mother that causes the instability.

Regarding 'kangaroo nutrition', there is little controversy, with accumulating evidence for the benefits of breastfeeding as such, and evidence that even preterm infants can exclusively breastfeed.

== See also ==
- Babywearing
- Infant massage
- Swaddling
