= Pediatric massage =

Massage therapy for children and adolescents

Pediatric massage is the complementary and alternative treatment that uses massage therapy, or "the manual manipulation of soft tissue intended to promote health and well-being" for children and adolescents. Its goal is to reduce pain, anxiety, loneliness and fear when children are hospitalized or diagnosed with a debilitating medical condition. Pediatric massage therapy takes into consideration each child's individual physical development, cognitive development and health care needs.

== Special Precautions ==
Massage therapists practice hands-on therapeutic techniques to address a variety of medical and non-medical concerns for patients. As with all massage specialties, advanced training matters. Special precautions should be taken due to the patient's vulnerability, both physically and emotionally, and to minimize risk and discomfort to the patient. Children may have apprehension relating to touch due to their medical treatments.

== Evidence ==
=== Infant massage ===
Infant massage is a type of complementary and alternative treatment that uses massage therapy for human infants. This therapy has been practiced globally, and has been increasingly used in Western countries as a treatment for infants, though the scientific evidence supporting its use is limited. Research into the effectiveness of massage therapy on full term infants has found some tentative evidence for some benefits such as gross motor skills, fine motor skills and psychomotor development, though the evidence is not strong enough to recommend universally, and more research is needed. Research in pre-term infants and low birth weight infants have found weak evidence that massage might improve weight gain, but these results are based on possibly biased studies and therefore no recommendation can be made for universal use.

=== Non-infant pediatric massage ===
- Reduced anxiety and tension
- Reduced pain
- Improved long-range emotional and cognitive development
- Improved healing/immune function
- Relaxation for the parent/caregiver and baby/child
- Improved gastrointestinal functioning/relief of gas and constipation
- Improved sleep patterns
- Increased parent-child bonding (when parent administered)
- Increased confidence in parenting skills (when parent administered)
- Improved focus and attention span

Research shows that massage therapy can ease both physical symptoms as well as emotional discomforts associated with pediatric medical conditions. The Touch Research Institute at the University of Miami School of Medicine is a primary medical research provider for massage and touch therapy, including pediatric massage and infant massage. Pediatric massage also can help manage chronic conditions such as asthma by providing relaxation and reducing muscle tone in the chest, back and neck, nausea, constipation and muscle aches (myalgia).

Immediately after receiving massage, children with mild to moderate juvenile rheumatoid arthritis notice decreased anxiety and stress hormone (cortisol) levels. For young patients with autism or ADHD, pediatric massage has been found to reduce their aversion to touch, while increasing their ability to focus. Pediatric patients with cystic fibrosis report feeling less anxious, and their ability to breathe and pulmonary functions improved.

Pediatric massage was also found to have benefit in relieving post-traumatic stress.

=== Limitations in research ===
Like many other complementary and alternative medicine modalities, many research studies reporting benefit from pediatric massage have been small in scale and vulnerable to bias. Comprehensive medical reviews of the existing pediatric massage research reinforce the benefits, but ask for larger-scale, scientifically rigorous studies. Physicians are recommended to educate themselves and their patients about the empirically validated benefits and precautions associated with pediatric massage.
