= Nathalie Charpak =

French and Colombian pediatrician

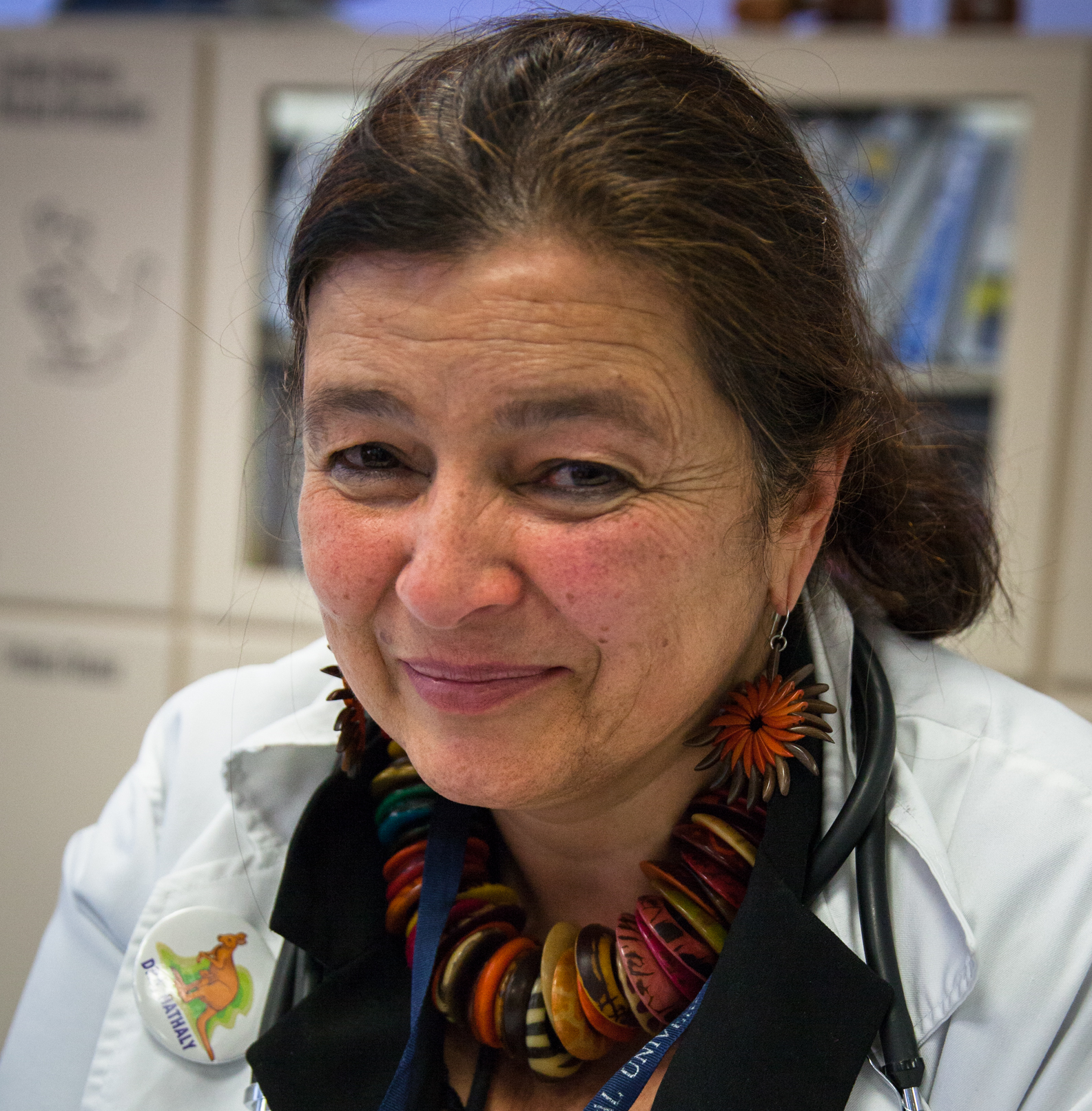
- Born: 1955 (age 69–70)

Nathalie Charpak (born 1955) is a French and Colombian pediatrician. As the founder and director of the Kangaroo Foundation, and associate researcher of the Pontifical Xavierian University, her research focuses on the care of low-birth weight preterm infants and the application of kangaroo mother care. Charpak's work has earned her, and the Kangaroo Foundation, multiple awards, including the Legion of Honour and the Save the Children Healthcare Innovation Award. Her father is Nobel Laureate Georges Charpak.

== Early life and education ==
Charpak grew up close to the France-Switzerland border where her father worked at CERN, before moving to Paris to complete her university education. She obtained her medical degree at University of Paris-Sud in 1981, before specializing in tropical and nutritional medicine in 1983 at the Pierre and Marie Curie University, then pediatrics at University of Paris-Sud in 1987. Charpak moved to Colombia in 1987 with her partner, Jose Tiberio Hernandez. The Colombian government recognized her degrees in 1988. Charpak practices medicine, does research, and is a public figure in Colombia. For her services to the nation, the Colombian government made her a Colombian citizen by decree in 2010.

== Career ==
Charpak worked as a medical doctor in several French hospitals before moving to Colombia in 1987. She then worked as a medical doctor and collaborating researcher with the Pontifical Xavierian University in Bogotá, an affiliation that she kept throughout her career. In 1988, she started working at the Colombian mother-infant institute (Instituto Materno-Infantil) where she met Sanabria and Martinez, pioneers of kangaroo mother care (KMC)—a novel technique to care for low birth-weight preterm infants. Charpak joined the first kangaroo mother care center in the world in 1989 and led several research studies to refine the technique and establish the impact on infants and their families. In 1993, she and neonatologist, Zita Figueroa, co-founded the Kangaroo Mother Care program at the Social Security Institute in Bogota. In 1994, she co-founded the Kangaroo Foundation with the goal of providing a structured, international KMC training and research center. In 2001, she and the Kangaroo Foundation created the Kangaroo Mother Program at Universidad Javeriana. The program now serves more than 1,000 infants every year and acts as a training facility for both domestic and international medical professionals. These institutions have trained more than 75 medical teams from over 35 countries. The World Health Organization has recognized the Kangaroo Foundation as the world's leading institution for KMC and asked the foundation to author world guidelines for KMC in 2003.

== Publications ==
Charpak has co-authored more than 120 research articles which have been cited more than 2,872 times. She has an h-index of 22 and eight of her papers have been cited more than 100 times each. She has also contributed chapters to eight books, and authored two general public books that have been translated into more than five languages: French: La methode kangourou: Comment les mères des enfants prématurés se substituent aux couveuses (1996) and Kangaroo Babies: A Different Way of Mothering (2006). She has also co-authored several technical publications, including the Kangaroo Mother Care guidelines for the WHO. In 2016, she released a publication in collaboration with Grand Challenges Canada, that presented a 20 year follow up of the KMC method versus traditional care. It gained wide public attention and was covered by more than 50 publications in various countries.

== Honors ==
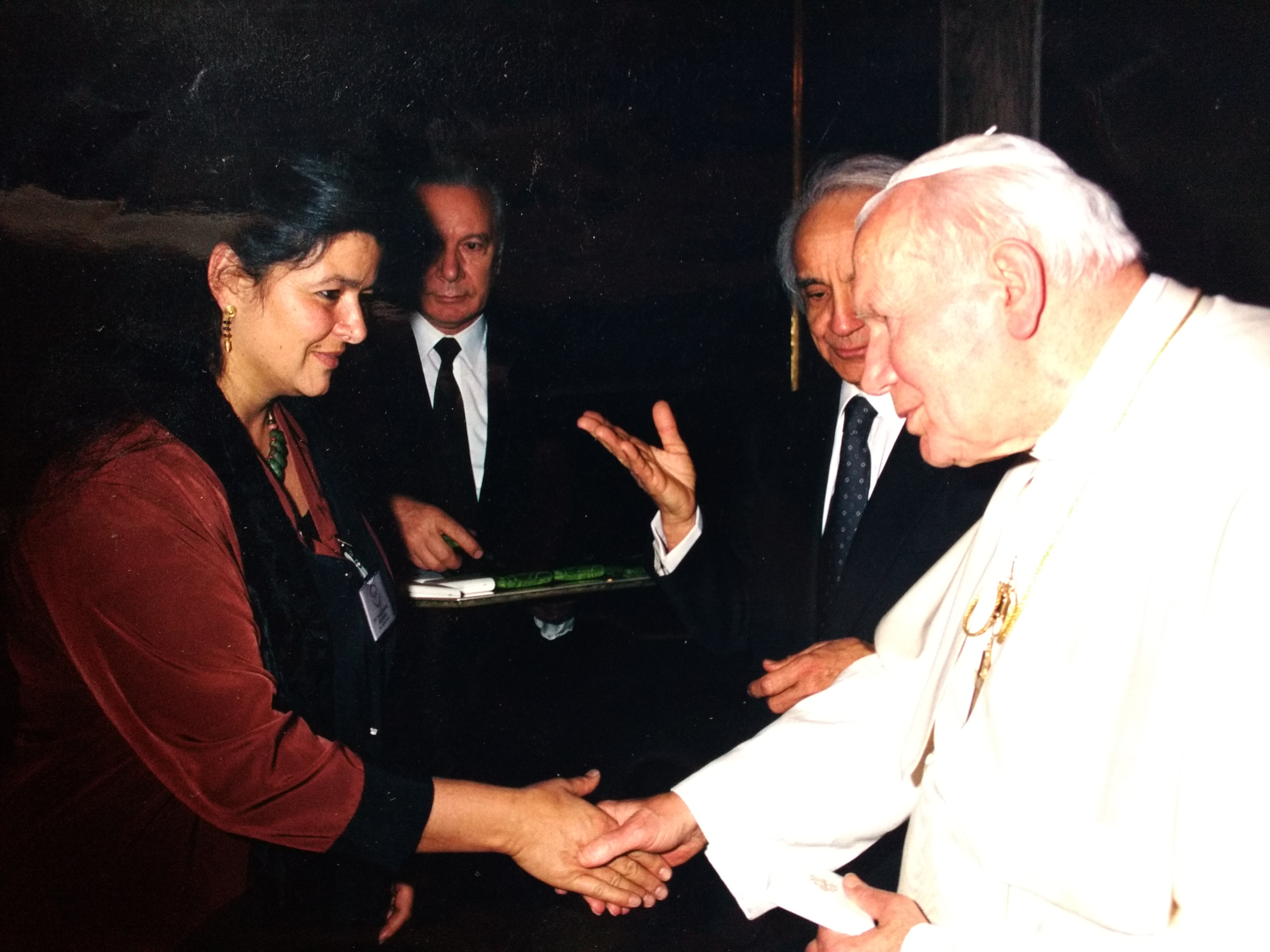
Doctor Charpak receiving the San Valentino medal from Pope Jean Paul II, in 1999

Charpak won several awards in the 1990s, including the Fundacion San Valentino award in 1999 given by Pope John Paul II. In the 2000s she won more awards like the Colsubsidio Prize and a Best Practices for Global Health Award. In 2010, she won the South-South Cooperation's Excellence Award, followed by multiple achievements in 2013, including a Health Care Innovation Award from GlaxoSmithKline and Save the Children.
