= Bening (baby carrier) =

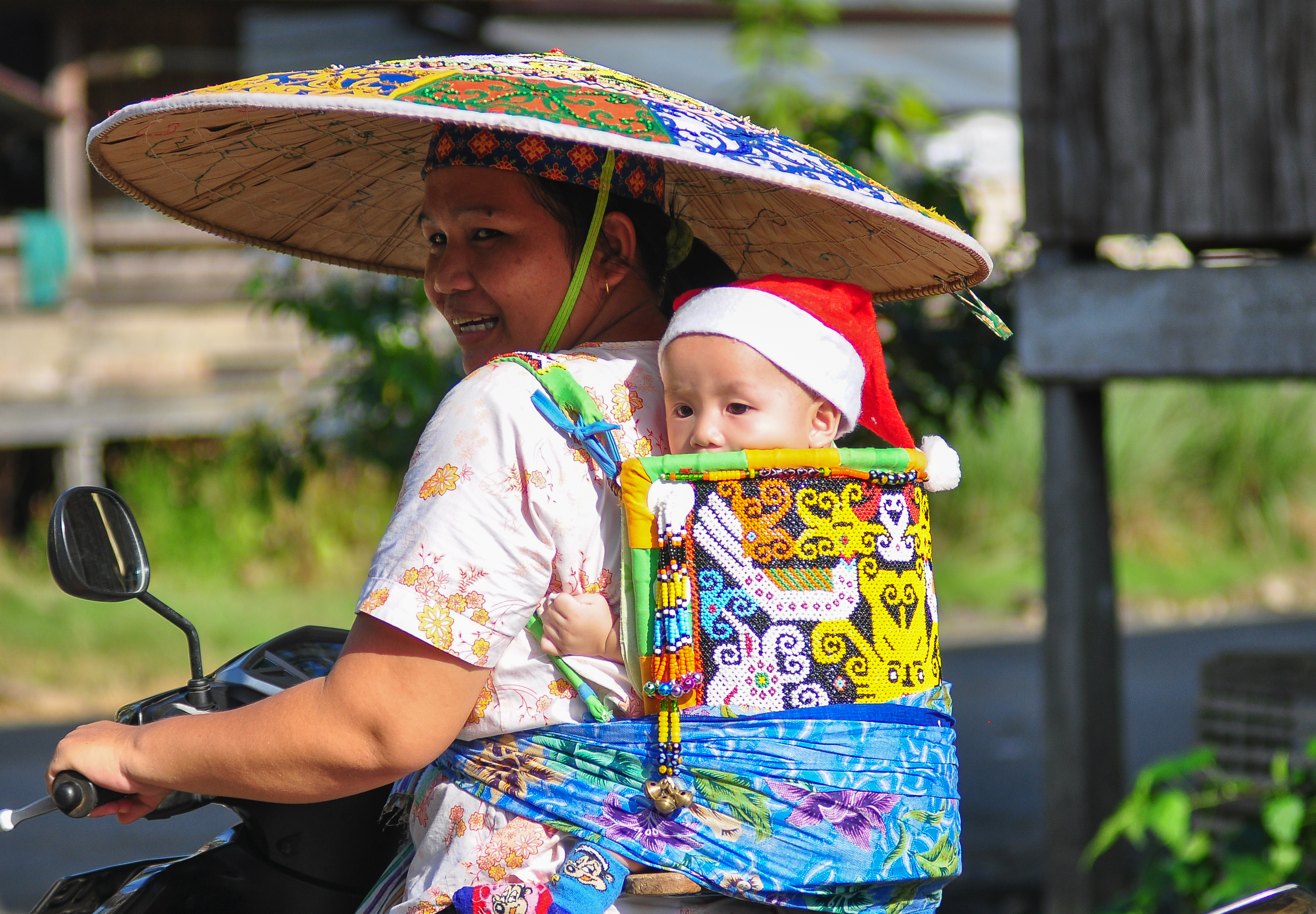
A Dayak woman carrying her baby with a bening while riding a motorcycle

The bening is a traditional baby carrier used by the Dayak people, especially the Dayak Kenyah in Bulungan Regency, North Kalimantan. It is made of carved wood and decorated with colorful wickers and beads, and sometimes also with metal currencies. Variations of images in the carved wood were based on the user's position in society. Images such as tiger and human face motifs indicate that the user is a member of the aristocracy or a noble family, while a plain bening without any decoration indicates the user is a commoner.

There are variations outside of Bulungan, such as around the Mahakam River in East Kalimantan, where instead of wood, most of the bening are made out of rattan. It is frequently used by Dayak parents when working on rice fields so that they can carry their child while still being able to work.

== See also ==
- Babywearing
