= Yee Bob Hsiung =

Taiwanese particle physicist

Yee Bob Hsiung (Chinese: 熊怡) is a Taiwanese particle physicist.

Hsiung earned his undergraduate degree from National Taiwan University, and his PhD at Columbia University in 1986. He later joined the Fermi National Accelerator Laboratory. In 2003, he returned to NTU as a professor. While based in Taiwan, Hsiung contributed to CERN's ATLAS experiment.

In 2000, Hsiung was elected a fellow of the American Physical Society, "[f]or his key role in the Fermilab neutral kaon decay program, particularly his leadership that resulted in the recent evidence for direct CP-violation."
