= Pediatric Clinics of North America =

- Discipline: Pediatrics
- Language: English

Publication details
- History: 1954-present
- Publisher: W. B. Saunders (United States)
- Frequency: Bimonthly
- Impact factor: 2.12 (2014)

Standard abbreviations
- ISO 4: Pediatr. Clin. N. Am.
- NLM: Pediatr Clin North Am

Indexing
- CODEN: PCNAA8
- ISSN: 0031-3955 (print); 1557-8240 (web)
- OCLC no.: 01643666

Links
- Journal homepage; Online access

Pediatric Clinics of North America is a clinical medical journal in pediatrics published by W. B. Saunders, an imprint of Elsevier.

== Abstracting and indexing ==
The journal is included in the following abstracting and indexing services: BIOSIS, CINAHL, Current Contents/Clinical Medicine and Current Contents/Life Sciences, Excerpta Medica, MEDLINE, and the Science Citation Index.
