= Babywearing =

Wearing or carrying a baby in a sling

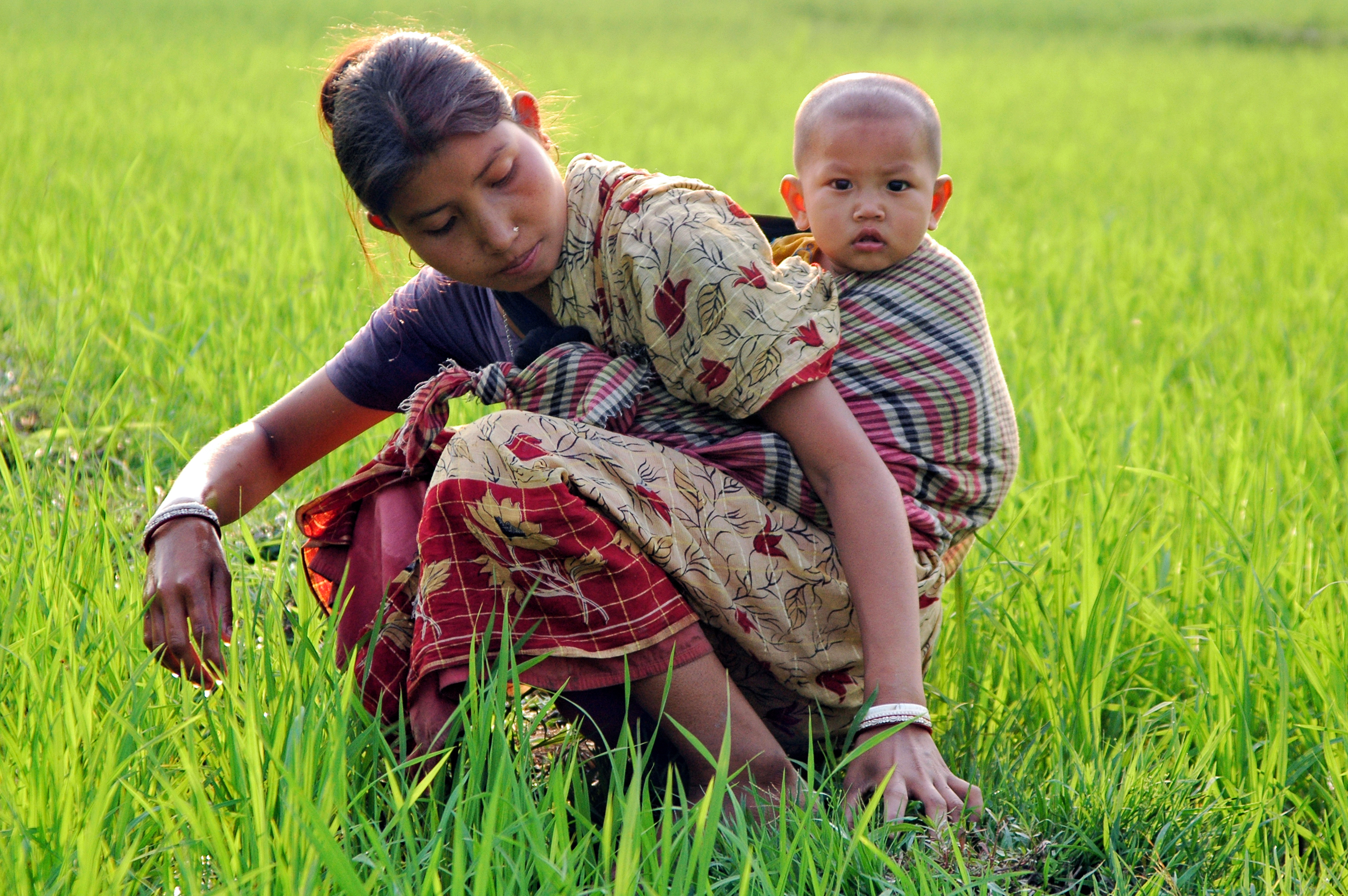
Traditional babywearing

Babywearing is the practice of wearing or carrying a baby in a sling or in another form of carrier. Babywearing has been practiced for millennia around the world. Babywearing is a form of baby transport which can be used for as long as mutually desired, often until toddlerhood and beyond. In the industrialized world, babywearing has gained popularity in recent decades. Part of the reason for this shift is due to the influence of advocates of attachment parenting.

== History ==
An early example of skin-to-skin infant care is the traditional Inuit woman's garment, the amauti, which has a large pouch at the back where the baby can sit against the mother's bare back.

The Dayak people of Borneo traditionally employed a wooden baby carrier called a bening.

== Benefits ==
Woman demonstrates how to use a stretch wrap style sling.

Pediatrician Dr. William Sears coined the phrase attachment parenting to describe an approach emphasizing the facilitation of strong bonds between a child and their parents. Sears attributes many benefits to babywearing and holding children generally.

The benefits of babywearing include:

- In the wearing of newborns in particular, the mothers' oxytocin levels are increased through the physical contact with the infant, leading to a more intimate maternal bond, easier breastfeeding and better care, thus lowering the incidence of postpartum depression and psychosomatic illness in the mother; similarly, the father carrying the baby has benefits for the paternal bond.
- Infants who are carried are generally calmer, as more of their primal/survival needs are met. The caregiver can be seen, heard, smelled, touched, tasted, provide feeding and the motion necessary for continuing neural development, gastrointestinal and respiratory health and to establish balance (inner ear development) and muscle tone is constant.
- Parental rhythms (walking, heartbeat, etc.) can have balancing and soothing effects on infants.
- Appropriate babywearing, particularly inward-facing babywearing can be beneficial to neck muscle development, and contribute positively to healthy hip development.
- Infants are "humanized" earlier by developing socially. Babies are closer to people and can study facial expressions, learn languages faster and be familiar with body language.
- Independence is established earlier.
- Attachment between child and caregiver is more secure.
- Decreases risk of positional plagiocephaly ("flat head syndrome") caused by extended time spent in a car seat and by sleeping on the back.
- It reduces DDH (developmental dysplasia of hip) which results due to longer durations spent in car seats or strollers. It allows wide base of support which supports ball and socket of hip which are not properly developed in babies or younger kids. Studies show it is less common in India due to their traditional way of carrying infants in their initial age.

Kangaroo care, in which the baby's bare body rests against the parent's bare chest, with or without a baby sling, has shown clear benefits to premature and ill infants.

Studies of parent-child attachment, parental satisfaction and infant crying point to babywearing as a satisfactory arrangement for both parents and baby. Baby carriers and slings help increase the number of hours a day an infant is held, and proponents believe that the more a baby is held, the less the baby cries. However, this experience is not universal; for example, the indigenous Munduruku people of Brazil use baby slings to carry their babies all day. The babies are allowed to nurse freely, and are passed from one woman or girl to another to be carried throughout the day. Yet, the Munduruku babies cry very frequently despite being carried all day.

== Practicality ==
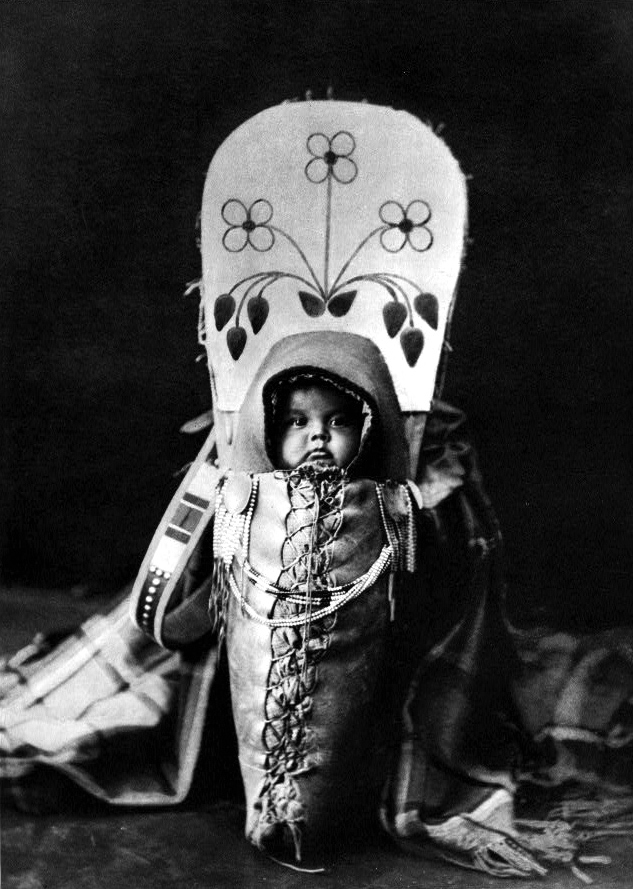
A traditional Nez Perce cradleboard (1911).

Babywearing allows the wearer to have two free hands to accomplish two handed tasks while caring for the baby's need to be held or be breastfed. Babywearing offers a safer alternative to placing a car seat on top of a shopping cart. It also allows children to be involved in social interactions and to see their surroundings as an adult would.

It follows that many sling and soft carrier users have found that carrying their infant is much easier on the back and shoulders than lugging them in a car seat. The weight of the child is spread more evenly across the upper body and they don't have to struggle with a bulky, hard and awkward car seat.

There are many different types of carriers. They can be purchased or made by the parent or caregiver. Wraps, baby slings, mei tais, backpack carriers and soft structured carriers with buckles (also referred to as SSCs) make up the vast majority of carriers. In the western world, carriers can also be seen as a fashion statement and be worn as part of an outfit. They come in many different designs and colors and are available in many different types of fabrics from specialist manufacturers, including bamboo, silk, hemp, cotton, wool, fleece, flax/linen and more recently some synthetic blends such as Repreve and Tencel.

== Infant feeding and babywearing ==
Breastfeeding and babywearing often go hand in hand. Many baby slings and other carriers offer mothers privacy and for many mothers, the option of nursing hands-free while tending to other activities or household chores. Not all mothers can nurse hands-free in a baby carrier. Large-breasted mothers and mothers of small or hypotonic infants may need to support the breast or help maintain proper positioning of the baby's head or body. Even so, a properly adjusted baby carrier can help reduce an arm strain and allow a parent more freedom of movement while nursing, even if it does not allow her to be completely hands-free.

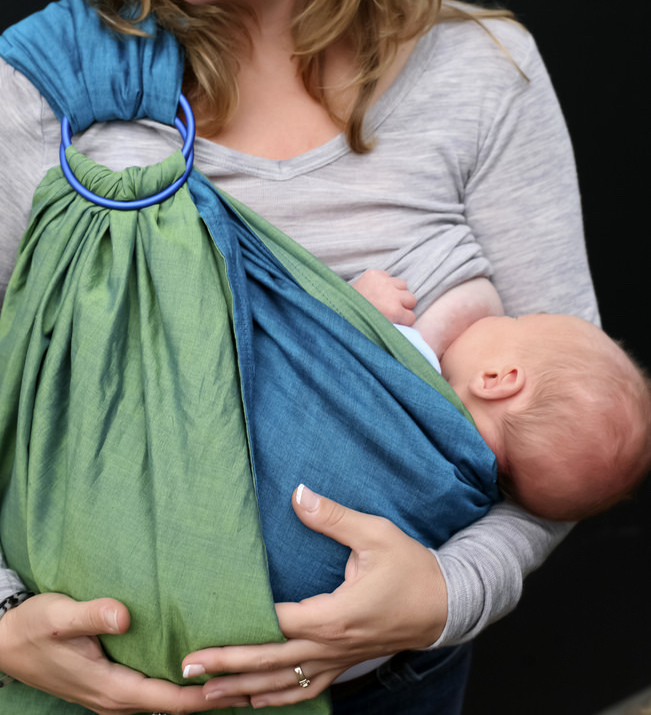
Mother breastfeeding infant in a ring sling baby carrier.

Babywearing can help premature babies and babies who are slow weight gainers to gain weight at a faster rate. Since the baby is held up close to the parent, the baby will be able to be nursed more often and often for longer intervals.

Breastfeeding with a sling or carrier is not simple for all parents. Before attempting to breastfeed in a carrier, it is critical to first master the technique of nursing without a carrier. Latch and position are critical, and they must be established before adding a carrier to the mix. In cases where nursing is problematic, babywearing can help to simplify other aspects of parenting by giving a parent free hands to deal with breastpumps, bottles, and other supplementation devices.

Some parents prefer, even with the best carriers, to take time out and sit down to nurse a baby. Some babies may reflexively clamp down when nursing while a parent moves around, so nursing while babywearing is not always entirely comfortable. Individual experience will vary radically not only from parent to parent, but also from baby to baby, even within the same family. Some babies nurse very well in slings and carriers, others do not.

Where breastfeeding is not possible, babywearing can aid attachment by encouraging closeness during bottle feeding. Daycare providers and foster parents often find that babywearing allows them to better meet the needs of multiple children by freeing hands during times when babies need to be held. It is possible to wear two children at once; this is known as tandem babywearing. This can be done with twins or with two children of different ages.

== Safety ==
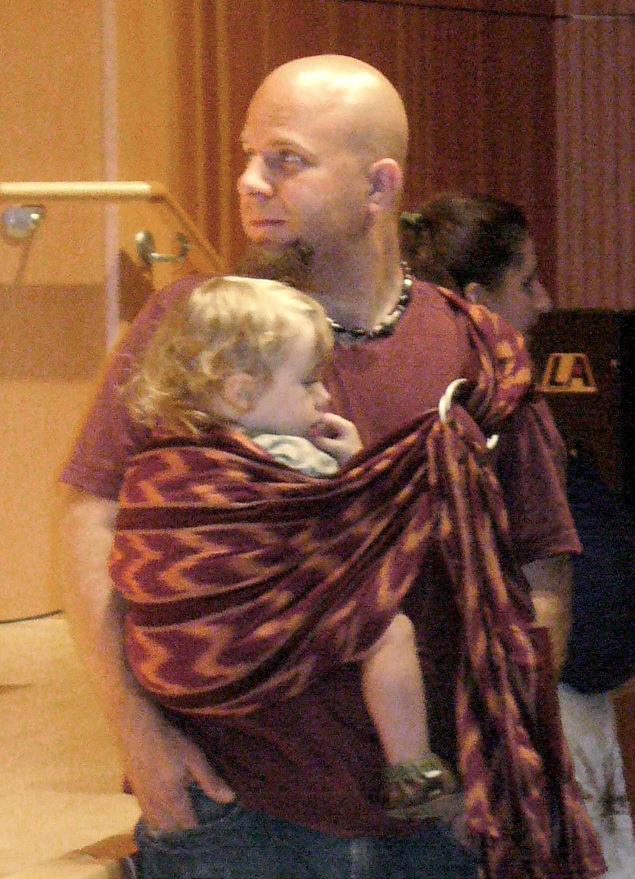
Father wearing his child

As with any physical activity, there are certain safety precautions which must be considered in babywearing. The guidelines are particularly important to remember when carrying a newborn baby that has limited head control. The acronym TICKS was created to assist with remembering the safety basics of babywearing:

- Tight
- In view
- Close enough to kiss
- Keep chin off the chest
- Supported back

In the case of a caregiver accidentally tripping or falling while wearing a baby, the wearer's arms would likely be free to break the fall, while the child remained relatively safe close to the carer's center of gravity. If the child was being carried in arms without a carrier, the likelihood of injury would be much higher due to the impossibility of the carer being able to both hold the child safely and protect themselves from injury.

Exercise with babies in slings and carriers is now a growing way of parents being able to undertake exercise and movement-based classes with their babies. It has been reported to increase mother-child bonding through physiological and neurological pathways. It is important to find a safe and qualified provider who can ensure the safety of the parent and the baby in the particular exercise class. Babywearing yoga is particularly popular as it does not involve bouncing and moving fast whilst carrying baby in slings.
