= World Prematurity Day =

November observance day

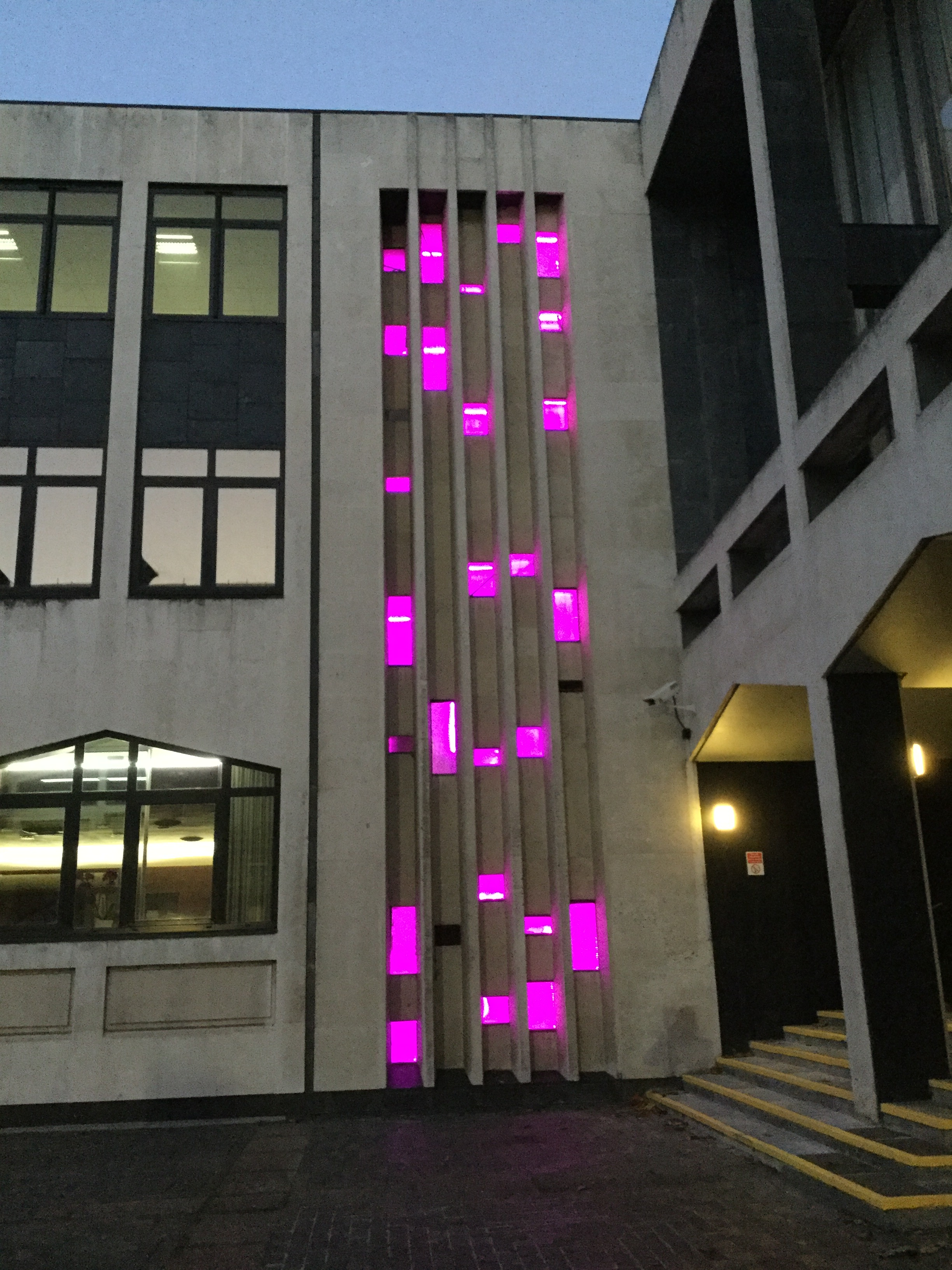
- Lights in Southend-on-Sea in recognition of World Prematurity Day
- Official name: World Prematurity Day
- Also called: WPD
- Observed by: worldwide
- Date: 15 November
- Next time: 15 November 2026
- Frequency: annual
- First time: 2011

World Prematurity Day is observed on 15 November each year to raise awareness of preterm birth and the concerns of preterm babies and their families worldwide. Approximately 15 million babies are born preterm each year, accounting for about one in 10 of all babies born worldwide. Premature birth is the leading cause of death in children under the age of five worldwide. Urgent action is always requested to address preterm birth given that the first country-level estimates show that globally 15 million babies are born too soon and rates are increasing in most countries with reliable time trend data. Preterm birth has been critical for progress on Millennium Development Goal 4 (MDG) for child survival by 2015 and beyond, and gives added value to maternal health (MDG 5) investments also linking to non-communicable diseases. For preterm babies who survive, the additional burden of prematurity-related disability may affect families and health systems.

November is Prematurity Awareness Month.

== History ==
The first international awareness day for preterm birth on 17 November was created by European parent organizations in 2008. It has been celebrated as World Prematurity Day since 2011. It has since evolved into a worldwide annual observance.

Parent groups, families, health professionals, politicians, hospitals, organisations and other stakeholders involved in preterm birth observe this day with media campaigns, local events and other activities conducted on local, regional, national or international level to raise awareness among the public. In 2013, WPD was celebrated in over 60 countries.

Purple is the official color for World Prematurity Day. Observers of World Prematurity Day may wear a purple ribbon pin or use a purple lightbulb.

People observing World Prematurity Day on Facebook, Twitter and Instagram use the hashtags: #PrematurityAwarenessMonth and #WorldPrematurityDay on their posts.

== See also ==
- Canadian Perinatal Network
