= Hearables =

Electronic ear-based devices

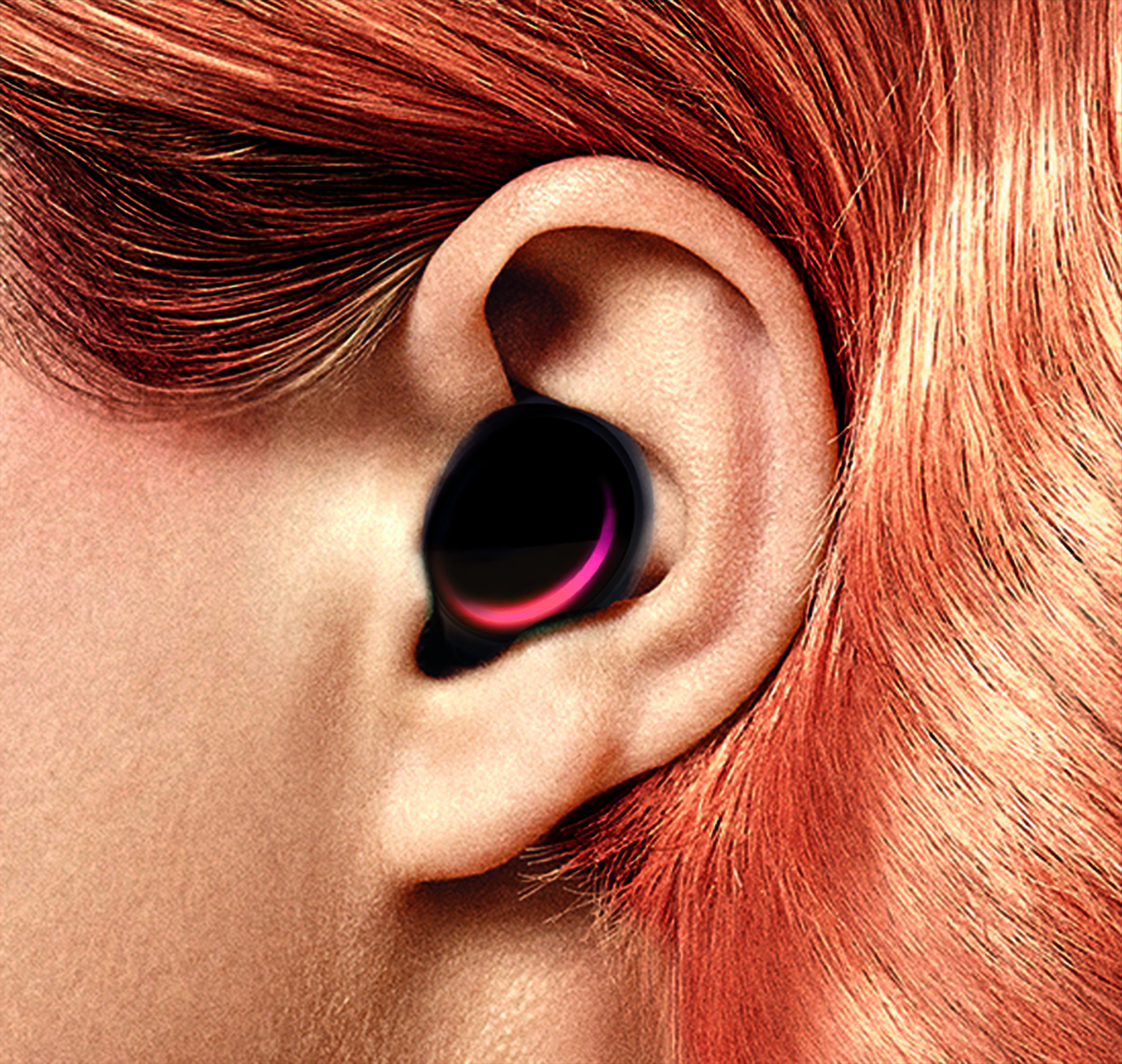
Hearable generic illustration

Hearables or smart headphones or earbuds are electronic in-ear devices designed for multiple purposes. The category is split between hearables for hearing health, and hearables for other applications.

== Terminology ==
The neologism "hearable" is a hybrid of the terms wearable and headphone, as hearables combine major assets of wearable technology with the basic principle of audio-based information services, conventional rendition of music and wireless telecommunication. The term was introduced in April 2014 simultaneously by Apple in the context of the company's acquisition of Beats Electronics and product designer and wireless application specialist Nick Hunn in a blogpost for a wearable technologies internet platform.

Hearables are often referenced as a subset of wearables. Sometimes the terms "smart headphones" or "smart advisors" are also used to denominate hearables. The news agency Reuters in its "Journalism media and technology predictions 2015" ranked voice-driven virtual assistants as an important field of innovation, including voice recognition software like Apple's Siri, Amazon's Echo, or Me-OS on Vinci headphones.

== Concept and use ==
The first description of a wearable ear-worn multimedia platform for health monitoring, heart rate monitoring, entertainment, guidance, and cloud-based communications was described by Valencell in 2006. Current advancements in the development of hearables aim at feature integration, size reduction, and covering a diverse range of applications. Controlled by touch, movement, thought or voice (or any combination of the mentioned control mechanisms) these miniaturized in-ear buds are designed primarily for the purposes of mobile communication, real time information services, activity tracking and various monitoring applications focusing on the wearers health conditions and body performance.

The hardware architecture typically comprises

1. Speakers, to convert analog signals to sound
2. Bluetooth IC, to communicate with other devices typically a smartphone
3. Sensors, to track heart rate, cadence, or to detect proximity
4. Microphones, to take or make phone calls, or take voice commands

Most of the "Hearables" seen to date are Bluetooth devices that use phones or PCs as the central computing unit. Vinci smart headphones, announced in 2016, incorporated a dual-core CPU, local storage, Wi-Fi, and 3G connectivity that allow users to use without a phone.

One important benefit of placing the entire interaction unit in-ear and addressing users purely through acoustic signals is the lower grade of overall distraction compared to vision based augmented reality tools or wearables with tactile signal, measuring and interaction mechanisms. At the same time acoustic warning signals – for example in case of an otherwise unnoticed medical crisis – are, as experiments have shown, more effective and immediate than visual indicators. Furthermore, the measurement of biometric data such as temperature, heart rate or oxygen saturation can be monitored through via PPG with significantly higher reliability and better response times through in ear monitoring than contact devices placed on wrist or torso.

A substantial amount of research around hearables is dedicated to aiding the hearing impaired and the increasing number of elderly people struggling with conventional input/output devices such as keyboard, mouse or touchscreen, as it is reflected for instance by the recent cooperation between the EHIMA (European Hearing Industry Manufacturer's Association) and the Bluetooth Special Interest Groupworks on the enhancement of conventional hearing aids by applying the newest Bluetooth generation for additional streaming of music, telecommunication and audio notifications. The European Commission has initiated a similar research project in mid 2013, with a projected runtime until summer 2016. This so-called "AAL Joint Programme" also involves the "Austrian Ministry of Traffic, Innovation and Technology", the Austrian Society for Research Funding and several privately owned technology companies. A somewhat more ambitious project is the inclusion of EEG in hearables, making it an example of ear-EEG.

== Current developments ==
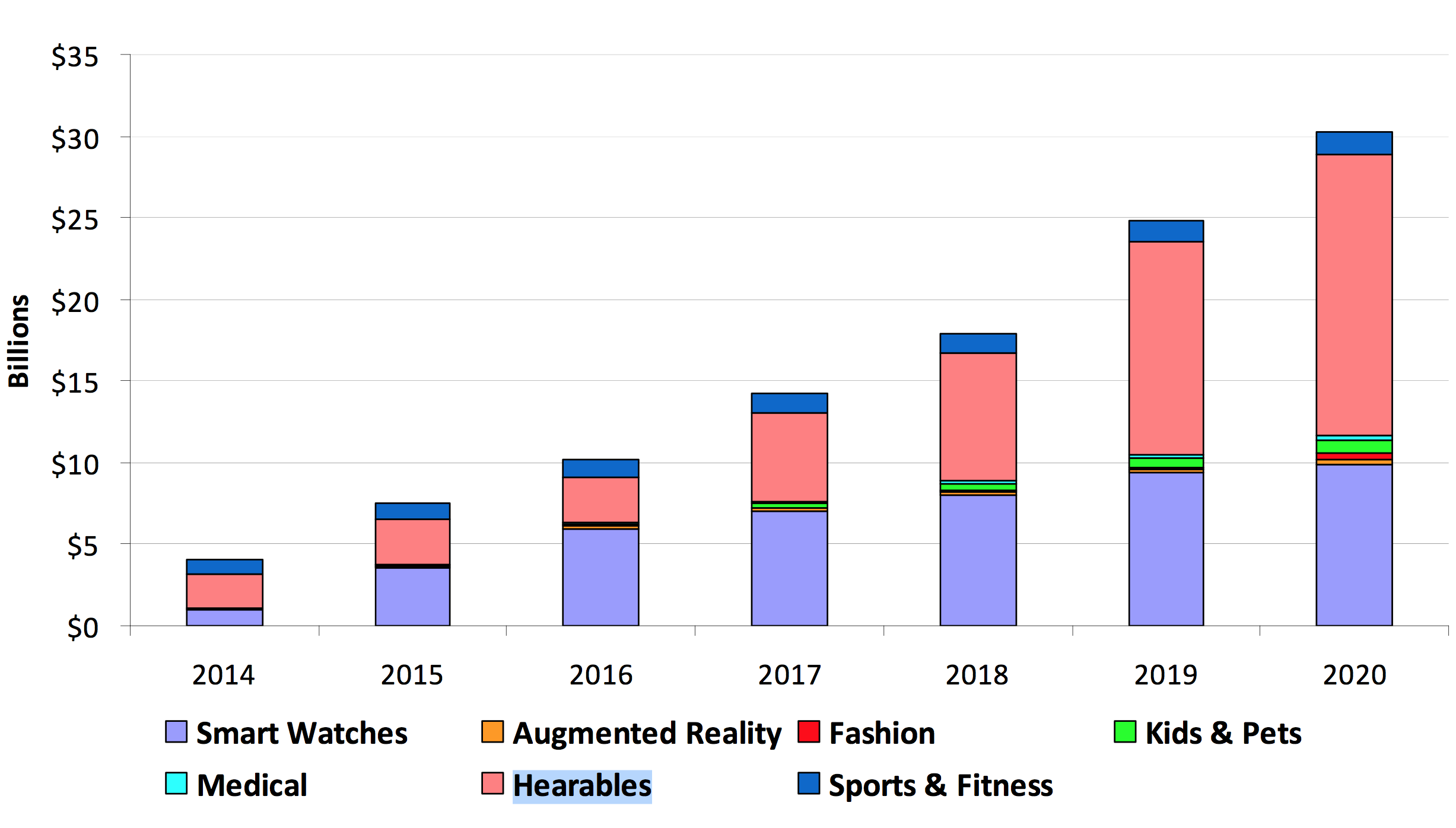
Global Revenue from Smart Wearables and hearables

Most systems in development are designed for binaural use and share a basic set of desired functionalities. Currently the deployment of hearables is on the agenda of many consumer technology manufacturers. The first hearable product to enter the marketplace was the iriverON Bluetooth headset, launched in late 2013, which integrated biometric sensor technology into a Bluetooth audio headset. Other biometric have since followed in the market, including the Jabra Sport Pulse, the Sony B-Trainer, the LG HR Earphone, and other biometric Bluetooth headsets. The core technology behind these products has been independently validated by Duke University. In the summer of 2014 "Earin", a headphone firm based in Lund (Sweden), started a crowdfunding campaign for their "Minuscule" earbuds, claiming them to become the smallest in ear headphones ever. However, the design details known as of today hint at „Minuscule“ being deployed as Bluetooth headphones and as such the earbuds will not completely comply with the definition of hearables in a broader sense. If they are to be seen as but an interim stage in the development of a multi-purpose in ear-piece is yet uncertain. A similar approach was chosen by headphone company OwnPhones, which is currently working on wireless, Bluetooth triggered earbuds, which can be fitted individually to the user's ear by a smartphone based measuring application triggering a 3D-printing device. The earphones will be fully compatible with all major smartphone and tablet manufactures, as well as notebooks and desktop computers. However an independent use of the earbuds is not yet projected, OwnPhones-earbuds will, for now, be controlled by primary electronic devices.

Apart from "Earin" and "Ownphones," the Munich-based technology company Bragi has advertised developments towards truly wireless smart earphones according to different publications such as Wired Magazine (10/2014), the Dutch daily newspaper De Telegraaf, and The Huffington Post. In early 2014 "Bragi" set up a crowdfunding campaign for "The Dash", claiming to realize the world’s first wireless performance tracking earbud which would eventually become the most successful crowd-sourcing campaign in Europe to date with a total revenue of roughly 3.3 million dollars. "The Dash", which according to public company announcements will reach start of production in autumn 2015, is projected to enable wearers to listen to music while tracking physical activity (speed, time, distance, cadence, elevation gain, etc.) and at the same time measure key data on body performance (heart rate, energy turnover, oxygen saturation, etc.). In January 2015 "The Dash" was awarded the "Innovation Award" of the CES (Consumer Electronic Show). held in Las Vegas. The preceding CES had already witnessed the release of LG's "Heart Rate Earphones", a device that connects wirelessly to the company's product "Lifeband Touch" and arbitrary smart devices via a "data processing medallion", which is attached to the earpieces applying a conventional wire connection.

Already in autumn 2014 "FreeWavz" was announced, a Bluetooth triggered headset developed by Florida-based ENT physician and fitness enthusiast Dr. Eric Hensen. The earpieces can be controlled independently and give acoustic updates on heart rate, oxygen saturation, calories burned, distance, speed and duration. However, unlike the approach chosen by Bragi, the FreeWavz headphones as yet fully depend on the interlinking with a smartphone or tablet via a dedicated app.

Several other companies are currently also investing development capacities in hearables. Among them are "Elbee", "Waverly Labs" and "Motorola", who with the "Moto Hint" already offer a hands-free, voice-controlled earbud for Bluetooth-enabled smartphones, and Alango Technologies, who has designed a hearable called "BeHear" that disrupts the hearing aid industry by putting a hearing enhancement solution that could previously only be provided by medical/healthcare professionals directly into the hands of users.

In May 2014 the British daily newspaper The Guardian reported on an information leak claiming that Apple Inc. had recently started to break into the wearables market by equipping their standard headphones with health monitoring features. However the article uncovered the unofficial source's information as totally fabricated. In September 2016, Apple made several announcements that could further propel the hearables market. One was the removal of the 3.5mm audio jack from the iPhone, which was denigrated by many. However, it fundamentally changed the dynamics of the market for wireless headphones. Two additional announcements were a new wireless chip allowing them to enter the world of hearables by launching their own brand of earbuds, known as Airpods.

A company, "United Sciences", founded in 2009, has developed a digital ear scanner which is used to make custom shaped hearables. Every individual has differently shaped ears and a custom shaped hearable provides comfort for long term wear. They are rumoured to have partnered with Google to develop custom shaped hearable for measuring pulse oxygenation, EEG, heart rate and for Brain computer interface.

In November, 2016, Vinci smart headphones were first seen on Kickstarter and successfully raised nearly $1M. The Vinci smart headphones integrate AI virtual assistant that manages users' music requests and other online services such as Spotify, Amazon Music, navigation on maps and search on Wiki. It also supports direct call for Amazon Alexa for voice services. It is the first of kind that combines a HiFi music player, a 32G local storage, voice recognition, activity tracking and biometric sensors (like heart rate). The Vinci smart headphones use a combination of touch, gesture and voice to provide a streamlined music listening experience. Vinci headphones carry an internal dual-core CPU thus no phones are needed when users go for a run or work out in a gym.

The NPD Group, which tracks retail sales in the US, has reported in June 2016 that the overall value of wireless headphone sales in the US overtook that of wired headphones, paving the way for a major hearable explosion. Now more than 50 hearable devices exist or are in crowdfunding stages to be brought to market.

In 2024, Nature Electronics reported on noise-canceling headsets that can create sound bubbles around the wearer. These devices combine artificial intelligence with noise-canceling technology to create customizable auditory zones—known as sound bubbles—that let users focus on speakers within a designated area around them while suppressing sounds outside it.
