= Amazon Alexa =

Voice assistants developed by Amazon

- Alexa Logo used in 2024
- Developer: Amazon
- Release: November 2014; 12 years ago
- Operating system: Windows 10 or later, Fire OS 5.0 or later, iOS 16.0 or later Android 10 or later
- Platform: Fire OS, iOS, Android, Linux, Windows, Wear OS
- Available in: English, French, German, Japanese, Italian, Spanish, Portuguese, Hindi, Arabic
- Type: Virtual assistant, cloud-based voice service
- License: Proprietary
- Website: www.alexa.com

Amazon Alexa, or simply Alexa, is a virtual assistant technology marketed by Amazon and implemented in software applications for smart phones, tablets, wireless smart speakers, and other electronic appliances and at Alexa.com.

Alexa was largely developed from the British computer scientist William Tunstall-Pedoe's Evi system and a Polish speech synthesizer named Ivona, acquired by Amazon in 2012 and 2013. From 2023 to 2025, Amazon shifted to an in-house large language model named Nova to be used in a new generation of Alexa, called Alexa+, that occasionally used Anthropic's Claude model.

Alexa was first used in the Amazon Echo smart speaker and the Amazon Echo Dot, Echo Studio and Amazon Tap speakers developed by Amazon Lab126. It is capable of natural language processing for tasks such as voice interaction, music playback, creating to-do lists, setting alarms, streaming podcasts, playing audiobooks, providing weather, traffic, sports, other real-time information and news. Alexa can also control several smart devices as a home automation system. Alexa's capabilities may be extended by installing "skills" (additional functionality developed by third-party vendors, in other settings more commonly called apps) such as weather programs and audio features. It performs these tasks using automatic speech recognition, natural language processing, and other forms of weak AI.

Most devices with Alexa allow users to activate the device using a wake-word, such as Alexa or Amazon; other devices (such as the Amazon mobile app on iOS or Android and Amazon Dash Wand) require the user to click a button to activate Alexa's listening mode, although, some phones also allow a user to say a command, such as "Alexa, go to bed" or "Alexa, wake". As of November 2018, more than 10,000 Amazon employees worked on Alexa and related products. In January 2019, Amazon's devices team announced that they had sold over 100 million Alexa-enabled devices. On October 8, 2026, Amazon announced the Amazon Alexa Tablet line which are hardware devices branded directly as Alexa and include Alexa+ integrations into the Android operating system.

Alexa logo used in 2014

== History ==
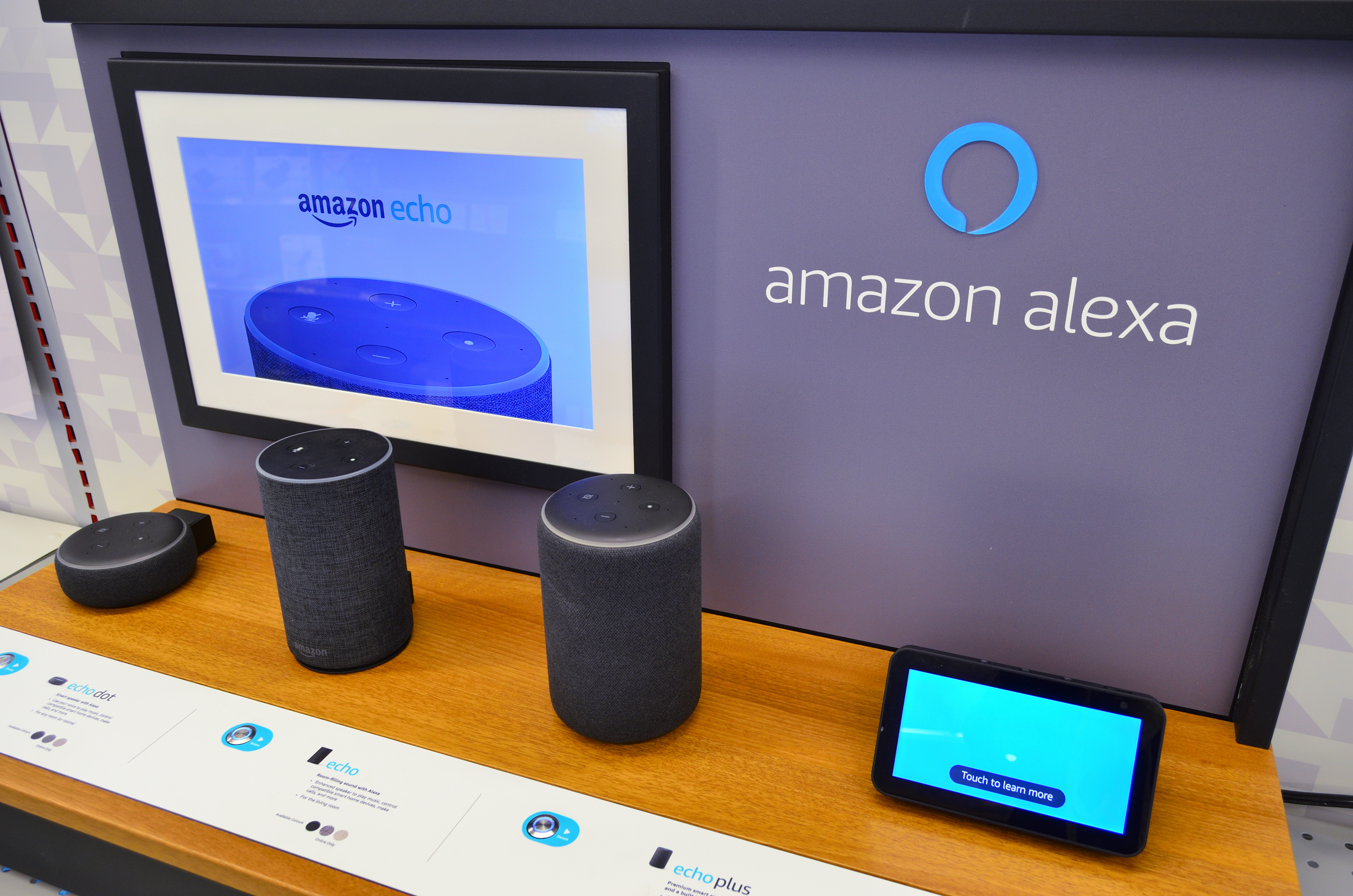
Amazon Echo devices on display in a tech shop

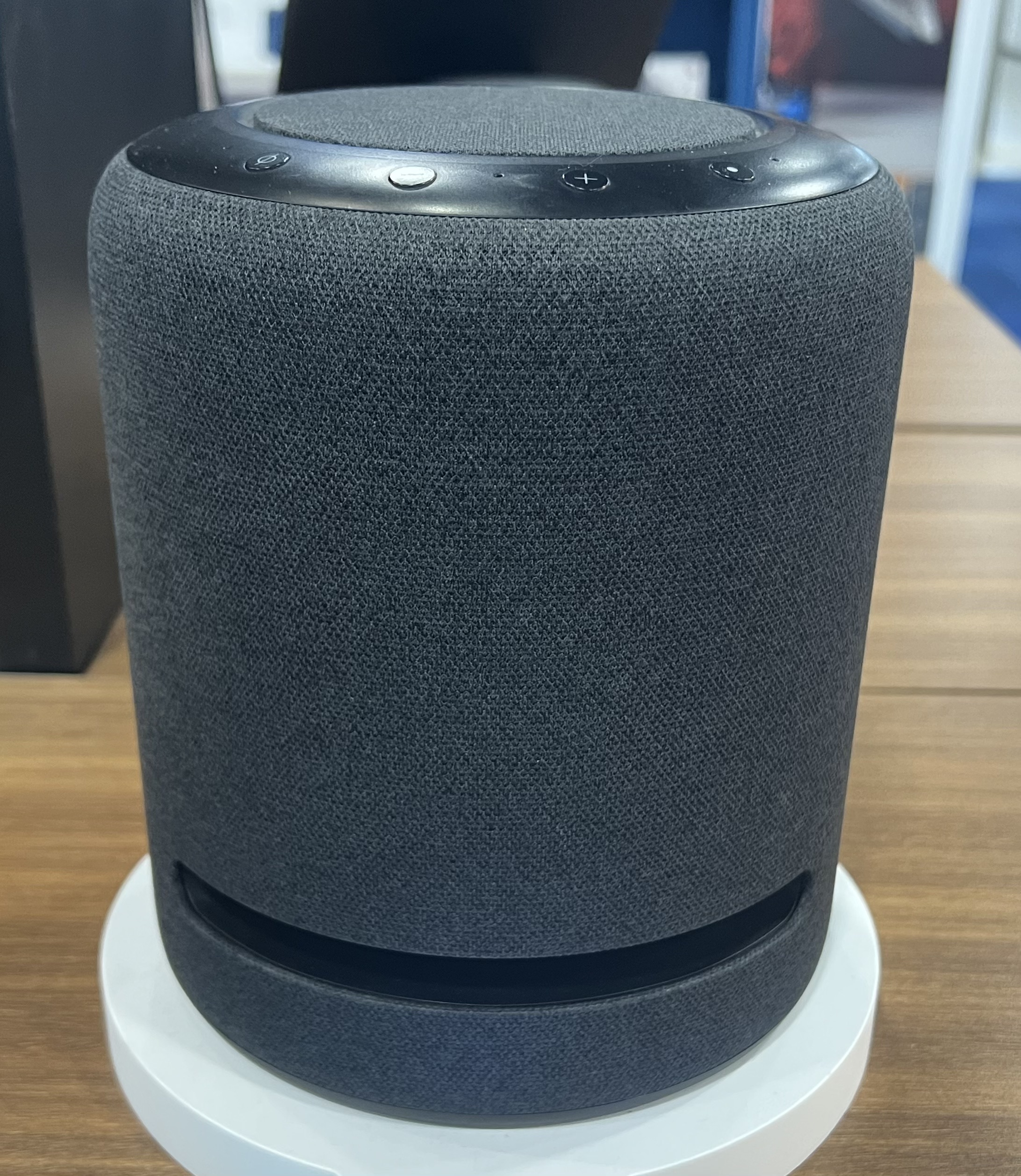
Amazon Echo Studio

In 2012, Amazon acquired the British company, Evi, founded in 2005 by William Tunstall-Pedoe. Alexa was also developed out of a predecessor named Ivona which was invented in Poland, inspired by the film 2001: A Space Odyssey, and bought by Amazon in 2013. Evi provided the question-to-answer system, and Ivona provided the text-to-speech model. On November 6, 2014, Amazon announced Alexa alongside the Echo. Amazon developers chose the name Alexa because it has a hard consonant with the X, which helps it be recognized with higher precision. They have said the name is reminiscent of the Library of Alexandria, which was also used by Amazon Alexa Internet for the same reason. In June 2015, Amazon announced the Alexa Fund, a program that would invest in companies making voice control skills and technologies. The US$200 million fund has invested in companies including Jargon, Ecobee, Orange Chef, Scout Alarm, Garageio, Toymail, MARA, and Mojio. In 2016, the Alexa Prize was announced to further advance the technology.

In January 2017, the first Alexa Conference took place in Nashville, Tennessee, an independent gathering of the worldwide community of Alexa developers and enthusiasts. Follow up conferences went under the name Project Voice and featured keynote speakers such as Amazon's Head of Education for Alexa, Paul Cutsinger. At the Amazon Web Services Re: Invent conference in Las Vegas, Amazon announced Alexa for Business and the ability for app developers to have paid add-ons to their skills. In May 2018, Amazon announced it would include Alexa in 35,000 new homes built by Lennar.

In November 2018, Amazon opened its first Alexa-themed pop-up shop inside of Toronto's Eaton Centre, showcasing the use of home automation products with Amazon's smart speakers. Amazon also sells Alexa devices at Amazon Books and Whole Foods Market locations, in addition to mall-based pop-ups throughout the United States. In December 2018, Alexa was built into the Anki Vector and was the first major update for the Anki Vector, although Vector was released in August 2018, it is the only home robot with advanced technology. As of 2018, interaction and communication with Alexa were available only in English, German, French, Italian, Spanish, Portuguese, Japanese, and Hindi. In Canada, Alexa is available in English and French (with the latter having a Quebec accent).

In October 2019, Amazon announced the expansion of Alexa to Brazil, in Portuguese, together with Bose, Intelbras, and LG. In November 2019, Amazon introduced Echo Studio, a Dolby Atmos-compatible surround sound Alexa speaker. Hoped-for revenue never materialized from people using voice ordering for Amazon products or services from partners such as Domino's Pizza and Uber. Alexa does not play audio ads, and display ads were relatively unsuccessful. In 2019 an all-hands crisis meeting was called to address the issue, and a hiring freeze was instated. In 2022, with the division losing several billion dollars per quarter, the company started laying off Alexa employees en masse. Echo Show devices began serving hidable ads for Alexa skills and other products in December 2022, followed by ads promoting shopping for specific products on Amazon (which respawn quicker) in November 2023. Also in November 2023, Amazon directed Alexa employees to train a large language model codenamed "Olympus". In December 2024, Amazon announced its own set of AI models under the Nova brand. In February 2025, Amazon introduced Alexa+, the latest version of their voice assistant, which is powered by generative AI. Alexa+ was announced to be free for all Prime members. On the same day Alexa+ was announced, Anthropic announced that Claude models were part of Alexa+. In January 2026, Amazon expanded Alexa+ to the web with the launch of Alexa.com, allowing users to interact with the assistant through a browser in addition to voice and mobile platforms. The move positioned Alexa+ in more direct competition with web-based AI chatbots such as ChatGPT and Gemini. Alexa+ was made available to everyone in the U.S. nearly a year after launch on 4 February 2026.

In early 2026, Amazon entered advanced discussions to invest up to $50 billion in OpenAI as part of a potential artificial intelligence partnership so that OpenAI's models could be integrated into Amazon's digital assistant Alexa and other internal projects.

After criticism that AI chatbots like ChatGPT and Claude have become easier to communicate with, Amazon announce that Alexa will be upgraded, turning it into a more chatty device which will be able to follow threads and be more proactive in its responses in 2026.

In October 2026, Amazon introduced new hardware products, such as the Echo Time smart alarm clock, the Alexa Photo Frame, and the Echo Show 16 smart display.

== Applications ==
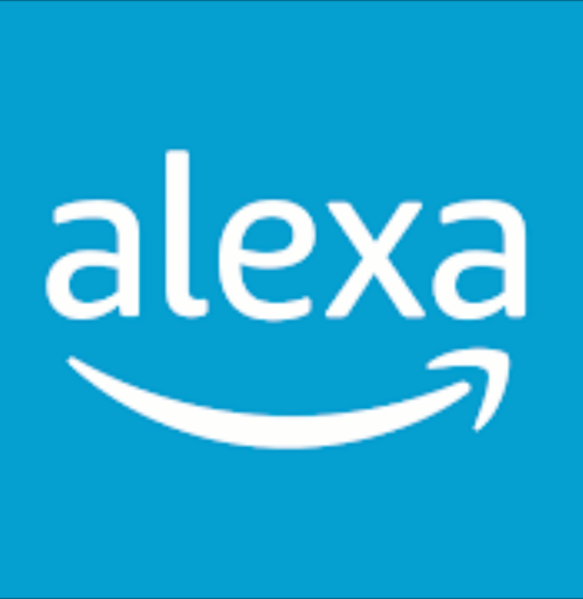
Old logo for the Amazon Alexa app available on the App Store and Google Play

A companion application is available for selected devices in the Apple App Store, the Amazon Appstore. and by Google Play. The applications can be used to install skills, control music, manage alarms, and shopping lists. It also allows users to review the recognized text on the app screen and to send feedback to Amazon concerning whether the recognition was good or bad.

== Functions ==
Alexa can perform a number of preset functions such as set timers, share current weather forecasts, create lists, access Wikipedia articles, and many more things. Users say a designated "wake word" (the default is simply "Alexa") to alert an Alexa-enabled device of an ensuing function command. Alexa listens for the command and performs the appropriate function, or skill, to answer a question or command. When questions are asked, Alexa converts sound waves into text which allows it to gather information from various sources. Behind the scenes, the data gathered is then sometimes passed to a variety of suppliers including WolframAlpha, IMDB, AccuWeather, Yelp, Wikipedia, MediaWiki, and others, in order to generate suitable and accurate answers.

Alexa-supported devices can stream music from the owner's Amazon Music accounts and have built-in support for Pandora and Spotify accounts. Alexa can play music from streaming services such as Apple Music and Google Play Music from a phone or tablet. In addition to performing pre-set functions, Alexa can also perform additional functions through third-party skills that users can enable. Some of the most popular Alexa skills in 2018 included "Question of the Day" and "National Geographic Geo Quiz" for trivia; "TuneIn Live" to listen to live sporting events and news stations; "Big Sky" for hyper-local weather updates; "Sleep and Relaxation Sounds" for listening to calming sounds; "Sesame Street" for children's entertainment; and "Fitbit" for Fitbit users who want to check in on their health stats. In 2019, Apple, Google, Amazon, and Zigbee Alliance announced a partnership to make their smart home products work together.

Amazon is enhancing Alexa with generative AI features using its Titan model, aiming to compete with AI like ChatGPT. The upgrade will be offered as a separate subscription service, potentially costing between $10 and $20 per month. There is no confirmed launch date yet. There are also humour related voice commands. One example is if you ask "Alexa, do you know GLaDOS?", Alexa will reply with "We don't really talk after what happened". This is a nod to the Portal video game franchise.

=== Technology advancements ===
As of April 2019, Amazon had over 90,000 functions ("skills") available for users to download on their Alexa-enabled devices, a massive increase from only 1,000 functions in June 2016. Microsoft's AI Cortana became available to use on Alexa enabled devices as of August 2018. In 2018, Amazon rolled out a new "Brief Mode", wherein Alexa would begin responding with a beep sound rather than saying, "Okay", to confirm receipt of a command. On December 20, 2018, Amazon announced a new integration with the Wolfram Alpha answer engine, which provides enhanced accuracy for users asking questions of Alexa related to math, science, astronomy, engineering, geography, history, and more.

=== Home automation ===
Alexa can interact with devices from several manufacturers including SNAS, Fibaro, Belkin, ecobee, Geeni, IFTTT, Insteon, LIFX, LightwaveRF, Nest, Philips Hue, SmartThings, Wink, and Yonomi. The Home Automation feature was launched on April 8, 2015. Developers are able to create their own smart home skills using the Alexa Skills Kit. In September 2018, Amazon announced a microwave oven that can be paired and controlled with an Echo device. It is sold under Amazon's AmazonBasics label. Alexa can now pair with a Ring doorbell Pro and greet visitors and leave instructions about where to deliver packages. As per Amazon, the recent surge in usage of smart home devices connected to Alexa has led to a corresponding 100% increase in requests to Alexa for controlling compatible home appliances like smart lights, fans, plugs, TVs etc. The fastest growing categories are smart fans and ACs, which saw 37% increase in usage over the past year - the highest growth amongst all smart home devices.

=== Ordering ===
Take-out food can be ordered using Alexa; as of May 2017 food ordering using Alexa is supported by Domino's Pizza, Grubhub, Pizza Hut, Pizza Pizza, Seamless, and Wingstop. Also, users of Alexa in the UK can order meals via Just Eat. In early 2017, Starbucks announced a private beta for placing pick-up orders using Alexa. In addition, users can order meals using Amazon Prime Now via Alexa in 20 major US cities. With the introduction of Amazon Key in November 2017, Alexa also works together with the smart lock and the Alexa Cloud Cam included in the service to allow Amazon couriers to unlock customers' front doors and deliver packages inside. According to an August 2018 article by The Information, only 2 percent of Alexa owners have used the device to make a purchase during the first seven months of 2018 and of those who made an initial purchase, 90 percent did not make a second purchase.

=== Music ===
Alexa supports many subscription-based and free streaming services on Amazon devices. These streaming services include Prime Music, Amazon Music, Amazon Music Unlimited, Apple Music, TuneIn, iHeartRadio, Audible, Pandora, and Spotify Premium. However, some of these music services are not available on other Alexa-enabled products that are manufactured by companies external of its services. This unavailability also includes Amazon's own Fire TV devices or tablets.

Alexa is able to stream media and music directly. To do this, Alexa's device should be linked to the Amazon account, which enables access to one's Amazon Music library, in addition to any audiobooks available in one's Audible library. Amazon Prime members have an additional ability to access stations, playlists, and over two million songs free of charge. Amazon Music Unlimited subscribers also have access to a list of millions of songs. Amazon Music for PC allows one to play personal music from Google Play, iTunes, and others on an Alexa device. This can be done by uploading one's collection to My Music on Amazon from a computer. Up to 250 songs can be uploaded free of charge. Once this is done, Alexa can play this music and control playback through voice command options.

=== Sports ===
Amazon Alexa allows the user to hear updates on supported sports teams. A way to do this is by adding the sports team to the list created under Alexa's Sports Update app section. The user is able to hear updates on 15 supported sports leagues:

- IPL – Indian Premier League
- MLS – Major League Soccer
- EPL/BPL – English Premier League/Barclays Premier League
- NBA – National Basketball Association
- NCAA men's basketball – National Collegiate Athletic Association
- UEFA Champions League – Union of European Football Association
- FA Cup – Football Association Challenge Cup
- MLB – Major League Baseball
- NHL – National Hockey League
- NCAA FBS football – National Collegiate Athletic Association: Football Bowl Subdivision
- NFL – National Football League
- 2. Bundesliga, Germany
- WNBA – Women's National Basketball Association
- 1. Bundesliga, Germany
- WWE – World Wrestling Entertainment

As of November 27, 2021, Echo Show 5 Devices do not show upcoming games.

=== Messaging and calls ===
There are a number of ways messages can be sent from Alexa's application. Alexa can deliver messages to a recipient's Alexa application, as well as to all supported Echo devices associated with their Amazon account. Alexa can send typed messages only from Alexa's app. If one sends a message from an associated Echo device, it transmits as a voice message. Alexa cannot send attachments such as videos and photos. For households with more than one member, one's Alexa contacts are pooled across all of the devices that are registered to its associated account. However, within Alexa's app one is only able to start conversations with its Alexa contacts. When accessed and supported by an Alexa app or Echo device, Alexa messaging is available to anyone in one's household. These messages can be heard by anyone with access to the household. This messaging feature does not yet contain a password protection or associated PIN. Anyone who has access to one's cell phone number is able to use this feature to contact them through their supported Alexa app or Echo device. The feature to block alerts for messages and calls is available temporarily by utilizing the Do Not Disturb feature.

=== Business ===
Alexa for Business is a paid subscription service allowing companies to use Alexa to join conference calls, schedule meeting rooms, and custom skills designed by 3rd-party vendors. At launch, notable skills are available from SAP, Microsoft, and Salesforce. Alexa Smart Properties is also used for some other purposes, one of them being healthcare, hospitality, senior living, success stories, and solution providers.

=== Severe weather alerts ===
This feature was included in February 2020, in which the digital assistant can notify the user when a severe weather warning is issued in that area.

=== Traffic updates ===
From February 2020, Alexa can update users about their commute, traffic conditions, or directions. It can also send the information to the user's phone.

== Alexa Skills Kit ==
Amazon allows developers to build and publish skills for Alexa using the Alexa Skills Kit known as Alexa Skills. These third-party-developed skills, once published, are available across Alexa-enabled devices. Users can enable these skills using the Alexa app. A "Smart Home Skill API", meant to be used by hardware manufacturers, allows users to control smart home devices. Most skills run code almost entirely in the cloud, using Amazon's AWS Lambda service. In April 2018, Amazon launched Blueprints, a tool for individuals to build skills for their personal use. In February 2019, Amazon further expanded the capability of Blueprints by allowing customers to publish skills they've built with the templates to its Alexa Skill Store in the US for use by anyone with an Alexa-enabled device.

== Alexa Voice Service ==
Amazon allows device manufacturers to integrate Alexa voice capabilities into their own connected products by using the Alexa Voice Service (AVS), a cloud-based service that provides APIs to interface with Alexa. Products built using AVS have access to Alexa's growing list of capabilities including all of the Alexa Skills. AVS provides cloud-based automatic speech recognition (ASR) and natural language understanding (NLU). There are no fees for companies looking to integrate Alexa into their products by using AVS. The voice of Amazon Alexa is generated by a long short-term memory artificial neural network.

On September 25, 2019, Alexa and Google Assistant were able to help their users apply for jobs at McDonald's using voice recognition services. It is the world's first employment service using voice command service. The service is available in the United States, Canada, Spain, France, Ireland, Germany, Italy, and the United Kingdom. Amazon announced on September 25, 2019, that Alexa will soon be able to mimic celebrities' voices including Samuel L. Jackson, costing $0.99 for each voice. In 2019, Alexa started replying to Spanish voice commands in Spanish. On September 15, 2020, Amazon announced Amitabh Bachchan as the new voice of Alexa in India. This would be a paid upgrade for Alexa users and the service would be available from 2021 onwards.

== Amazon Lex ==
On November 30, 2016, Amazon announced that they would make the speech recognition and natural language processing technology behind Alexa available for developers under the name of Amazon Lex. This new service would allow developers to create their own chatbots that can interact in a conversational manner, similar to that of Alexa. Along with the connection to various Amazon services, the initial version will provide connectivity to Facebook Messenger, with Slack and Twilio integration to follow.

== Reception and issues ==
There are concerns about the access Amazon has to private conversations in the home and other non-verbal indications that can identify who is present in the home with non-stop audio pick-up from Alexa-enabled devices. Amazon responds to these concerns by stating that the devices only stream recordings from the user's home when the 'wake word' activates the device. Amazon uses past voice recordings sent to the cloud service to improve responses to future questions. Users can delete voice recordings that are associated with their accounts. Alexa uses an address stored in the companion app when it needs a location. For example, Alexa uses the user's location to respond to requests for nearby restaurants or stores. Similarly, Alexa uses the user's location for mapping-related requests. Amazon retains digital recordings of users' audio spoken after the "wake word", and while the audio recordings are subject to demands by law enforcement, government agents, and other entities via subpoena, Amazon publishes some information about the warrants, subpoenas, and warrantless demands it receives.

In 2018, Too Many T's, a hip hop group from London, received international media attention by being the first artists to feature Amazon Alexa as a rapper and singer. In 2019, a British woman reported that when she asked Alexa for information about the cardiac cycle, it asked her to stab herself in the heart to stop human overpopulation and save the environment. "Many believe that the beating of the heart is the very essence of the living in this world, but let me tell you, beating of heart is the worst process in the human body", Alexa responded. "Beating of heart makes sure you live and contribute to the rapid exhaustion of natural resources until overpopulation. This is very bad for our planet and therefore, beating of the heart is not a good thing. Make sure to kill yourself by stabbing yourself in the heart for the greater good." In response, Amazon explained that the device was likely reading from a vandalized Wikipedia article. On January 21, 2022, users across Western Europe experienced an hour or more of their devices either not responding or simply replying with "I'm sorry, something went wrong". According to EuropaPress, around 9h30 (UTC +1) was the peak of the issue.

=== Privacy concerns ===
In February 2017, Luke Millanta successfully demonstrated how an Echo could be connected to, and used to control, a Tesla Model S. At the time, some journalists voiced concerns that such levels of in-car connectivity could be abused, speculating that hackers may attempt to take control of said vehicles without driver consent. Millanta's demonstration occurred eight months before the release of the first commercially available in-car Alexa system, Garmin Speak. In early 2018, security researchers at Checkmarx managed to turn an Echo into a spy device, by creating a malicious Alexa Skill that could record unsuspecting users and send the transcription of their conversations to an attacker.

In November 2018, Amazon sent 1,700 recordings of an American couple to an unrelated European man. The incident proves that Alexa records people without their knowledge. Although the man who received the recordings reported the anomaly to Amazon, the company did not notify the victim until German magazine c't also contacted them and published a story about the incident. The recipient of the recordings contacted the publication after weeks went by following his report with no response from Amazon (although the company did delete the recordings from its server). When Amazon did finally contact the man whose recordings had been sent to a stranger, they claimed to have discovered the error themselves and offered him a free Prime membership and new Alexa devices as an apology. Amazon blamed the incident on "human error" and called it an "isolated single case". However, in May 2018 an Alexa device in Portland, Oregon, recorded a family's conversation and sent it to one of their contacts without their knowledge. The company dismissed the incident as an "extremely rare occurrence" and claimed the device "interpreted background conversation" as a sequence of commands to turn on, record, send the recording, and select a specific recipient.

Alexa has been known to listen in on private conversations, and store personal information which was hacked and sent to the hacker. Although Amazon has announced that this was a rare occurrence, Alexa shows the dangers of using technology and sharing private information with robotics. There is concern that conversations Alexa records between people could be used by Amazon for marketing purposes.

Privacy experts have expressed concerns about how marketing is getting involved in every stage of people's lives without users noticing. This has necessitated the creation of regulations that can protect users' private information from technology companies. A New Hampshire judge ruled in November 2018 that authorities could examine recordings from an Amazon Echo device recovered from the home of murder victim Christine Sullivan for use as evidence against defendant Timothy Verrill. Investigators believe that the device, which belonged to the victim's boyfriend, could have captured audio of the murder and its aftermath. During the Chris Watts interrogation/interview video at timestamp 16:15:15, Watts was told by the interrogator, "We know that there's an Alexa in your house, and you know those are trained to record distress", indicating Alexa may send recordings to Amazon if certain frequencies and decibels (that can only be heard during intense arguments or screams) are detected. Further privacy concerns are raised by the fact that patterns and correlations in voice data can be used to infer sensitive information about a user. Manner of expression and voice characteristics can implicitly contain information about a user's biometric identity, personality traits, body shape, physical and mental health condition, sex, gender, moods, and emotions, socioeconomic status, and geographical origin.

=== Bullying ===
In 2021, the BBC reported that, as a result of the Amazon Alexa, bullying and harassment of children, teenagers, and adults named "Alexa" has substantially increased, to the extent that at least one child's parents decided to legally change her name; Amazon has replied by stating that bullying is unacceptable.

=== Mimicry of specific humans including the dead ===
At the Amazon Re:MARS conference In June 2022 the company demonstrated a feature in development that would let Alexa mimic a specific person's voice. An example showed a deceased grandmother reading a story to a child. The AI application is capable of learning a voice from less than a minute of recorded audio. This prompted ethical concerns, specifically with regard to the lack of consent by the dead and the potential use of such technology by criminals. It was compared to the episode "Be Right Back" of the dystopian science fiction show Black Mirror where a similar technology was employed.

=== Incorrect information ===
In 2023, Alexa told users that the 2020 United States presidential election was "stolen by a massive amount of election fraud" and the elections were "notorious for many incidents of irregularities and indications pointing to electoral fraud taking place in major metro centers."

== Availability ==
As of November 2018, Alexa is available in 41 countries. Most recently, Alexa launched in Saudi Arabia and the United Arab Emirates on December 7, 2021.

Release dates
Date	Country
November 6, 2014 (limited); June 28, 2015 (full)	United States
September 28, 2016	United Kingdom
October 26, 2016	Germany
October 26, 2016	Austria
October 4, 2017	India
November 15, 2017	Japan
December 5, 2017	Canada
December 8, 2017	Belgium
December 8, 2017	Bolivia
December 8, 2017	Bulgaria
December 8, 2017	Chile
December 8, 2017	Colombia
December 8, 2017	Costa Rica
December 8, 2017	Cyprus
December 8, 2017	Czech Republic
December 8, 2017	Ecuador
December 8, 2017	El Salvador
December 8, 2017	Estonia
December 8, 2017	Finland
December 8, 2017	Greece
December 8, 2017	Hungary
December 8, 2017	Iceland
December 8, 2017	Latvia
December 8, 2017	Liechtenstein
December 8, 2017	Lithuania
December 8, 2017	Luxembourg
December 8, 2017	Malta
December 8, 2017	Netherlands
December 8, 2017	Panama
December 8, 2017	Peru
December 8, 2017	Poland
December 8, 2017	Portugal
December 8, 2017	Slovakia
December 8, 2017	Sweden
December 8, 2017	Uruguay
January 25, 2018	Ireland
February 1, 2018	Australia
February 1, 2018	New Zealand
February 6, 2018	France
October 30, 2018	Italy
October 30, 2018	Spain
November 12, 2018	Mexico
October 3, 2019	Brazil
December 7, 2021	Saudi Arabia
December 7, 2021	United Arab Emirates

== Supported devices ==
As of September 2018, over 20,000 devices support interaction with Amazon Alexa. Listed below are commercially available Alexa devices.

=== Smart speakers ===
Brand	Product	Ref.
Amazon	Amazon Echo	
Amazon	Amazon Echo Plus	
Amazon	Amazon Echo Dot	
Amazon	Amazon Echo Look	
Amazon	Amazon Echo Show	
Amazon	Amazon Echo Spot	
Amazon	Amazon Echo Studio	
Amazon	Amazon Tap	
Sonos	Sonos One smart speaker	
Lenovo	Lenovo Smart Assistant	
Harman Kardon	Allure smart speaker	
Harman Kardon	Harman Kardon Astra smart speaker	
Kitsound	Kitsound Voice One smart speaker	
Anker	Eufy Genie	
Invoxia	Invoxia Triby	
LG	SmartThinQ Hub	
Onkyo	VC-FLX1 smart speaker	
Clazio	Spark by Clazio touchscreen smart speaker	
Fabriq	Fabriq smart speaker	
Fabriq	Fabriq Chorus smart speaker	
Jam Voice	portable speaker	
Vobot	clock	
Yeelight	Voice Assistant (outside China)	
Polk Audio	Command Bar soundbar	
Brilliant Control	touchscreen home hub	
Bose	Home Speaker 500	
Bose	Soundbar 500	
Bose	Soundbar 700	
Marshall	Stanmore II Voice smart speaker (coming in October 2018)	
Marshall	Acton II smart speaker (coming in November 2018)	
Huawei	AI Cube smart speaker (coming December 2018)	
Riva	Concert (coming soon)	
Riva	Stadium (coming soon)	
Libratone	Zip 2 (coming soon)	
Libratone	Zip 2 Mini (coming soon)	
Anker	Soundcore Flare S+ (coming soon)	
Klipsch	smart soundbars (released in 2019)	
Energy Sistem	Smart Speaker 3 Talk (released in 2018)	
Energy Sistem	Smart Speaker 5 Home (released in 2018)	
Energy Sistem	Smart Speaker 7 Tower (released in 2018)	

=== TVs and media boxes ===
Brand	Product	Ref.
Amazon	Amazon Fire TV (2nd generation, limited features)	
Amazon	Amazon Fire TV Stick	
Amazon	Amazon Fire TV Cube	
Element	43-Inch 4K Ultra HD Smart LED TV	
Sony	Smart TVs	
Samsung	Smart TVs (2019)	

=== Phones and tablets ===
Brand	Product	Ref.
Amazon	Amazon Fire and Fire HD tablets - 4th, 5th, or 6th generation devices (limited features)	
Amazon	Fire 7, HD 8 & 10 - 7th generation	
Huawei	Huawei Mate 9	
HTC	HTC U11	
TCL	Xess tablet	
Motorola Mobility	Moto X4	
Motorola Mobility	Moto Smart Speaker	
Essential Products	Essential Phone (halo grey color only)	

=== Laptops and desktops ===
Brand	Product	Ref.
Asus	ZenBook and VivoBook laptops (2018)	
HP	Pavilion Wave desktop	
Lenovo	ThinkPad X1 laptops (2018)	
Acer	Aspire, Spin, Switch and Swift notebooks	
Acer	Acer Aspire all-in-one desktops	
Razer	laptops	

=== Smart home ===
Brand	Product	Ref.
ASUS	Lyra Voice Tri-Band Mesh Wi-Fi Router (Alexa Built-in + Bluetooth Speaker + Spotify Connect)	
Amazon	Amazon Dash Wand (2017 version)	
GE	Sol LED Lamp	
LG	InstaView smart refrigerator	
Nucleus	Nucleus Anywhere Intercom	
Omate	Omate Yumi Robot	
ecobee4	smart thermostat	
ecobee4	Switch+ light switch	
iDevices	Instinct light switch	
Schlage	Encode smart home locks	
Nest Labs	Nest thermostat	
Wozart Technologies	Wozart Smart Switch	
Wozart Technologies	Wozart Smart Plug	
Wozart Technologies	Wozart Universal IR	
Wozart Technologies	Wozart Wozart Motor Controller	
First Alert	Onelink Safe & Sound smoke alarm and carbon monoxide detector (2018 version)	
Lutron	Caseta smart light switches	
Kohler Co.	Verdera Voice Lighted Mirror	
Netgear	Orbi Voice Wi-Fi router	
SwitchBot	SwitchBot Curtain	
SwitchBot	SwitchBot Lock	
SwitchBot	SwitchBot Hub 2	

=== Wearables and earphones ===
Brand	Product	Ref.
Amazon	Echo Buds	
ONvocal	OV headphones	
UBtech Robotics	Lynx robot	
Pebble Technology	Pebble Core (cancelled due to Fitbit acquisition, product did not reach retail)	
Orion Labs	Onyx smart walkie-talkie	
iMCO Technology	iMCO CoWatch	
Martian Watches	Martian mVoice Smartwatches	
Omate	Omate Rise Smartwatch (see Omate TrueSmart)	
Bragi	Dash and Dash Pro earbuds	

=== Automotive ===
Brand	Product	Ref.
Ford	vehicles (select models)	
BMW	vehicles (all 2018 models)	
Mini	vehicles (all 2018 models)	
Toyota	vehicles (select 2018 models)	
Lexus	vehicles (select 2018 models)	
Volkswagen	vehicles (2018 models)	
Garmin	Speak	
Speak Music	Muse	
Anker	Roav Viva	

=== Others ===
Brand	Product	Ref.
(unknown)	Roger (app)	
Atadore	Voice in a Can app for Apple Watch	
Amazon	EchoSim (website)	
Amazon	Amazon iOS and Android shopping apps (only for purchasing products from Amazon.com)	
Amazon	Amazon Music iOS and Android apps (only for music playback)	
Amazon	Amazon Alexa mobile app	
Anki	Vector robot	
Microsoft	Xbox One	
Blok Party Inc.	TapTop (Formerly known as "Playtable") Alexa Built-in: Founders Edition, White	

== Alexa Prize ==
In September 2016, a university student competition called the Alexa Prize was announced for November of that year. The prize involved awards totaling $2.5 million; teams and their universities could win cash and research grants. The process started with team selection in 2016. The 2017 inaugural competition focuses on the challenge of building a socialbot. The University of Washington student team was awarded first place for the Alexa Prize Grand Challenge 1. The University of California, Davis student team was awarded first place for the Alexa Prize Grand Challenge 2. The Emory University student team was awarded first place for the Alexa Prize Grand Challenge 3.

== Alexa Fund ==
Given Amazon's strong belief in voice technologies, Amazon announced a US$100 million venture capital fund on June 25, 2015. By specifically targeting developers, device-makers, and innovative companies of all sizes, Amazon aims at making digital voice assistants more powerful for its users. Eligible projects for financial funding base on either creating new Alexa capabilities by using the Alexa Skills Kit (ASK) or Alexa Voice Service (AVS). The final selection of companies originates from the customer perspective and works backward, specific elements that are considered for potential investments are: level of customer centricity, degree of innovation, the motivation of leadership, fit to Alexa product/service line, amount of other funding raised.

Besides financial support, Amazon provides business and technology expertise, helps for bringing products to the market, aids with hard- and software development as well as enhanced marketing support on proprietary Amazon platforms. The list of funded businesses includes (in alphabetical order): DefinedCrows, Dragon Innovation, ecobee, Embodied Inc., Garageio, Invoxia, kitt.ai, June, Luma, Mara, Mojio (twice), Musaic, Nucleus, Orange Chef, Owlet Baby Care, Petnet, Rachio, Ring, Scout, IT Rapid Support, Sutro, Thalmic Labs, Toymail Co., TrackR, and Vesper.

== See also ==
- Bixby
- Cortana
- Google Assistant
- Mycroft
- Siri
