= Garageio =

Smart home garage door controller

Garageiorori
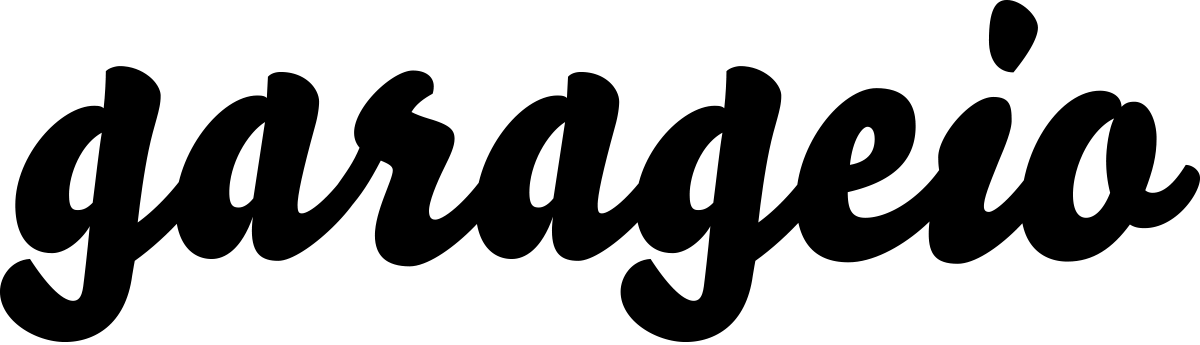
- Company type: Private
- Founded: 2012
- Headquarters: Columbus, Ohio
- Key people: Zak Dziczkowski (Co-Founder, CEO); Dave Reif (Co-Founder)
- Industry: Internet of Things
- Employees: 4
- Parent: Alottazs Labs LLC
- Website: garageio.com
- Native clients on: iOS, Android

Garageio is a smart home garage door controller created by Alottazs Labs, LLC headquartered in Columbus, Ohio. Alottazs Labs, LLC is a privately held company founded in October 2012. Garageio is an Internet of Things product providing managed garage and gate access via a smartphone and other web-enabled devices.

Garageio consists of a WiFi enabled control hub which attaches to the garage door opener and controlled through the Garageio mobile or desktop application. The control hub can connect up to three separate garage doors from the same device.

The Garageio iOS and Android application allows the user to remotely manage each connected garage door independently. The user can also grant and accept access to other garage doors from other Garageio users.

== History ==
The idea for Garageio began in 2012 when co-founder Zak Dziczkowski discovered his garage door remote was missing. Zak soon discovered that the replacement cost for a new remote was too expensive and envisioned a better way to control the garage door. That same night Zak called co-founder Dave Reif and together they began to work on the Garageio prototype.

In October 2012, Garageio became a product of Alottazs Labs, LLC bringing aboard additional co-founders, entrepreneur Greg Colarich, creative designer Jess Boonstra, and marketer Zach Cochran.

Garageio spent the early part of the year focusing on application development and product design. Garageio was the recipient of the Cool Idea! Award by Minnesota-based plastic manufacturer Proto Labs which provided gratis prototype casings and a subsequent production run of parts. In November 2013, Garageio launched a successful crowd-funding campaign through Fundable raising $30,000 in pre-order sales.

Garageio began shipping early in 2014 to its early crowd-funding backers and continued to take orders through its website. Garageio released an updated version of the application and announced additional platform integrations such as IFTTT (if this than that), which allows users to create recipes that trigger customized events. Garageio IFTTT recipes include events such as if it rains then close my garage or if I leave my house close my garage. Garageio increased its manufacturing network and continued to ship throughout North America.

Garageio was one of the first recipients of the Alexa Fund, a fund by Amazon.com to support startups on voice control technology.
