= Protolabs =

Rapid manufacturing company

- Formerly: The ProtoMold Company
- Traded as: NYSE: PRLB; S&P 600 Component
- Founded: 1999; 27 years ago
- Founder: Larry Lukis
- Headquarters: Maple Plain, Minnesota, U.S.
- Area served: Global
- Key people: Larry Lukis, Brad Cleveland Vicki Holt, Suresh Krishna (CEO)
- Products: Prototyping and production parts
- Revenue: $501 million (2024)
- Number of employees: 2,300 (2025)
- Website: www.protolabs.com

Protolabs is a company that provides rapid manufacturing of 3D printed, CNC-machined, sheet metal, and injection-molded custom parts for prototyping and production. Markets like medical devices, aerospace, electronics, appliances, automotive and consumer products use these parts. Protolabs' headquarters are located in Maple Plain, Minnesota, with Minnesota-based manufacturing facilities in Plymouth, Brooklyn Park, and Rosemount, along with additional facilities in Nashua, New Hampshire and Cary, North Carolina. Outside the U.S., the company has manufacturing facilities in England and Germany, in addition to its supplier network of 250 manufacturing partners around the world.

In 2025, the company shifted its strategy to focus on both custom prototyping and end-use production parts to serve engineers, buyers, and procurement teams across the full manufacturing life cycle.

== History ==
=== Protomold ===
In 1999, Larry Lukis founded the Protomold Company, Inc., that specialized in the quick-turn manufacture of custom plastic injection molded parts. Protomold was recognized for its small batch molded parts and rush orders. He previously ran ColorSpan, an original equipment manufacturer that produces printers and desktop publishing systems. He was the chief technology officer of Protomold. Later, in 2001, Brad Cleveland joined Protomold as CEO and president.

In 2005, Protomold opened up its first UK plant in Telford, England. Two years later, Protomold introduced the Firstcut quick-turn CNC machining service.

=== Protolabs ===
In 2009, the company combined its Protomold and Firstcut services under its corporate name, Proto Labs Inc., known colloquially and in official messaging as Protolabs.

In 2009, Protolabs opened a location in Japan to serve Japanese design engineers. In the same year, Firstcut, a service from Protolabs, made available CNC-machined prototype parts in aluminum, as well as ABS, nylon, and PEEK.

In February 2012, Protolabs completed its initial public offering of common stock.

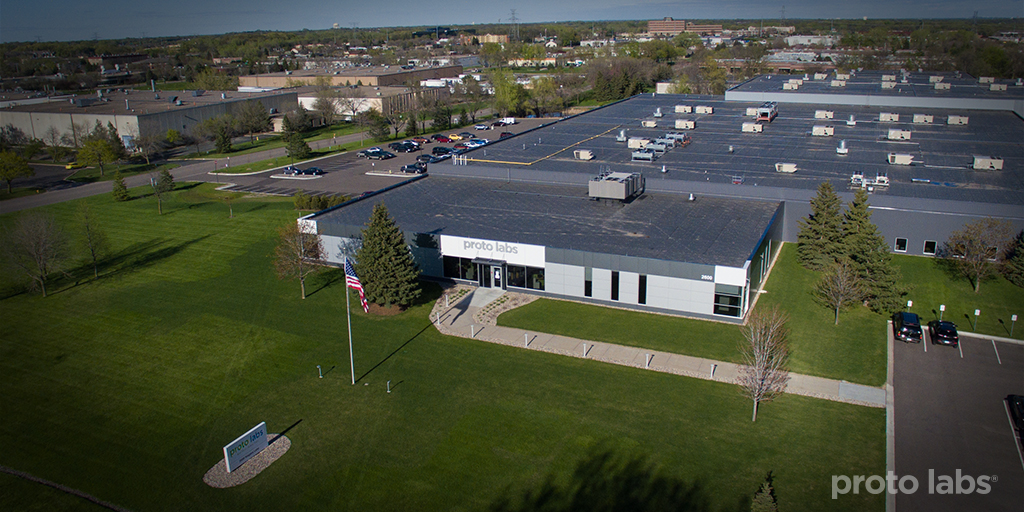
An aerial view of Protolabs manufacturing facility in Plymouth, Minnesota.

In 2013, Protolabs reached $150 million in revenue. In 2014, Protolabs acquired FineLine Prototyping Inc., a North Carolina-based 3D printing company. In fall 2016, Protolabs' 3D printing services moved to a new 77,000 sq. ft. facility in Cary, North Carolina. The company also opened a CNC machining plant in Plymouth, Minnesota.

In February 2014, Vicki Holt was named CEO.

In November 2017, Protolabs acquired RAPID Manufacturing in Nashua, New Hampshire for an aggregate purchase price of $120 million to expand into sheet metal fabrication capabilities.

=== COVID-19 Pandemic ===
During the 2019–2020 coronavirus pandemic, Protolabs began producing face shields, plastic clips, and components for coronavirus test kits for use in Minnesota hospitals. The company also collaborated with the University of Minnesota to produce parts for a low-cost ventilator.

=== 2021 - 2025 ===
In January 2021, Protolabs announced an agreement to acquire Amsterdam-based manufacturing platform 3D Hubs for $280 million in cash and stock plus incentives. The acquisition added a distributed model of manufacturing partners to Protolabs’ existing in-house factories and 3D Hubs was ultimately rebranded to Protolabs Network in 2024.

In March 2021, Holt retired and was succeeded as CEO by VP and GM of Americas, Robert Bodor, according to a company announcement.

Bodor led Protolabs through May, 2025, when the company appointed Suresh Krishna as its new president and CEO. Prior to joining Protolabs, Krishna served as president and chief executive officer at Northern Tool + Equipment, a manufacturer and retailer of tools and commercial equipment.

== Awards ==
- In 2004, the Minneapolis/St Paul Business Journal named Protomold to the top of its “Growth 50” list.
- In 2010 and 2013, Protolabs was awarded the Queen's Awards for Enterprise.
- In June 2012, Larry Lukis and Brad Cleveland won the Ernst & Young Entrepreneur of the Year Award for their work with Protolabs.
- In 2013 and 2014, Protolabs was recognized by Forbes in the top 5 of America's Best Small Companies.
- In 2015, Protolabs was recognized as one of the top-ranked rapid prototyping vendors in the United States by their customers.
- In 2016, Workplace Dynamics recognized Protolabs as a top-ranked workplace in Minnesota
- In 2016, the Minnesota High Tech Association awarded Protolabs (alongside Recombinetics, Sentera, and 12 other companies) with a Tekne award for its work in advanced manufacturing.

== See also ==
- Injection molding
- 3D printing
- CNC machining
- Milling (machining)
- Casting
- Computer-aided design
- Digital manufacturing
