= Valencell =

- Company type: Incorporated
- Industry: Wearable Technology Sensors
- Founded: 2006
- Founders: Dr. Mike Aumer, Dr. Steven LeBoeuf, Dr. Jesse Tucker
- Headquarters: Raleigh, United States
- Number of locations: Raleigh
- Area served: Global
- Number of employees: +35
- Website: www.valencell.com

Valencell is a US-based biometric technology company that develops biometric sensor technology for wearables and hearables, and provides its patent-protected technology to consumer electronics manufacturers in various industries. Valencell's PerformTek technology enables wearables and hearables to continuously measure biometrics such as heart rate, blood oxygen levels, blood pressure, heart rate variability, respiration rate, VO_{2} and other parameters for health and fitness assessment. The technology can be integrated into products designed by consumer electronics manufacturers, mobile device and accessory makers, medical device, sports and fitness, and hearing aid companies. Valencell has more than 60 patents granted, plus more than 100 patents pending. More than 35 companies utilize Valencell's technology and intellectual property, which has been commercialized in wearable devices made by companies including Bose, Suunto, LG, Jabra, Samsung, and Sony.

== History ==
Valencell was co-founded by a team of scientists and engineers - President Dr. Steven LeBoeuf, VP Engineering Dr. Jesse Tucker and VP Product Management Dr. Mike Aumer, and has been augmented further with R&D talent since the company was formed in 2006. Since inception, the company has won more than $3 million in government grants and has raised more than $35 million in venture funding from investor firms such as WSJ Joshua Fund, GII Tech, and TDF Ventures. In June 2018, Valencell raised $10.5M from Sonion and existing investors.

== Biometrics lab ==
In September 2014, Valencell opened the Valencell Biometrics Lab, an exercise science lab designed to test biometric wearables and hearables in their intended use cases. The Biometrics Lab tests more than 400 different devices from various manufacturers each year and analyzes over one million biometric data points on a monthly basis. Volunteers test wearable devices in 25 distinctive testing protocols ranging from hard intervals to easy lifestyle efforts.
