= Amazon Dash =

Ordering service

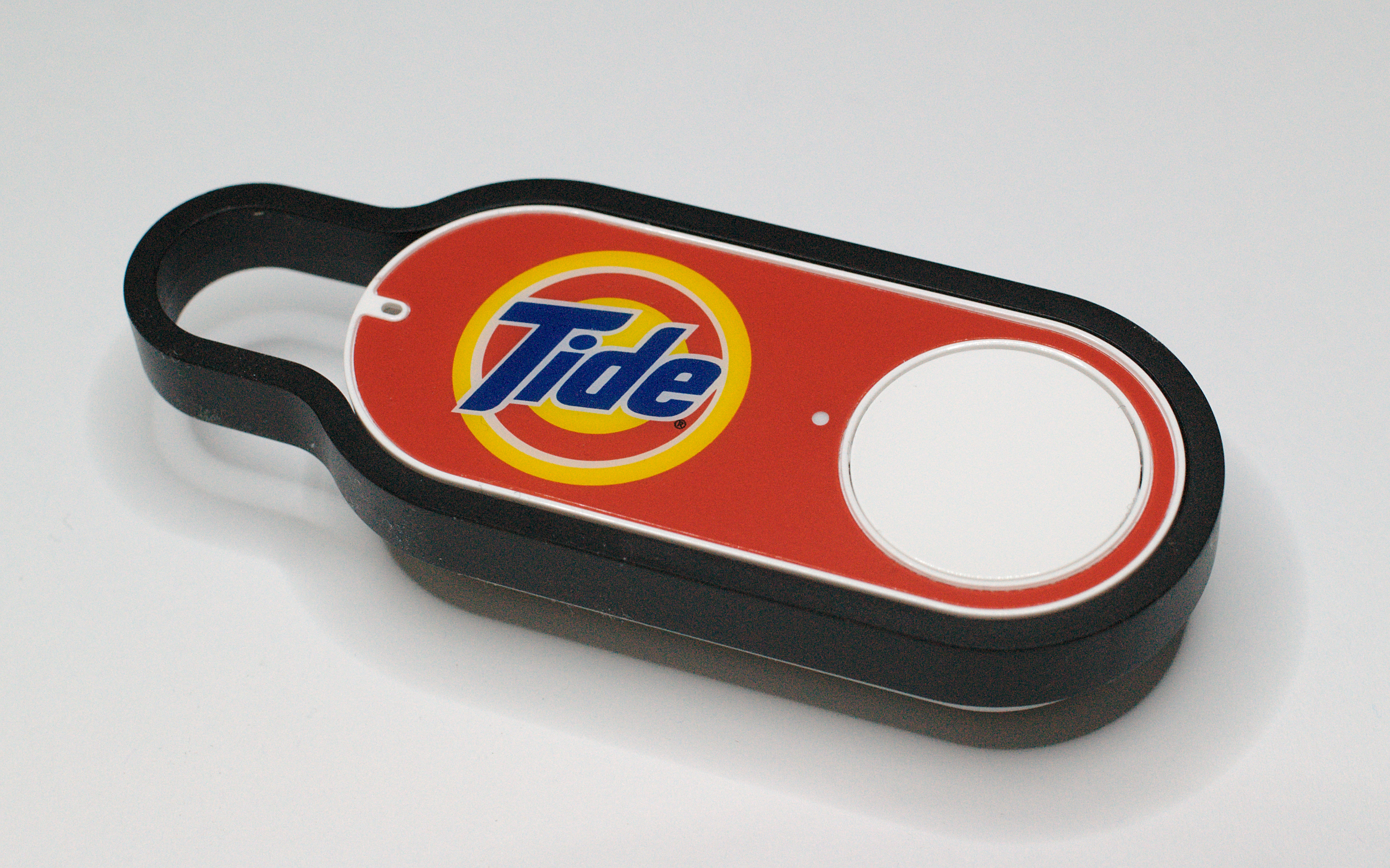
An Amazon Dash Button for Tide laundry detergent

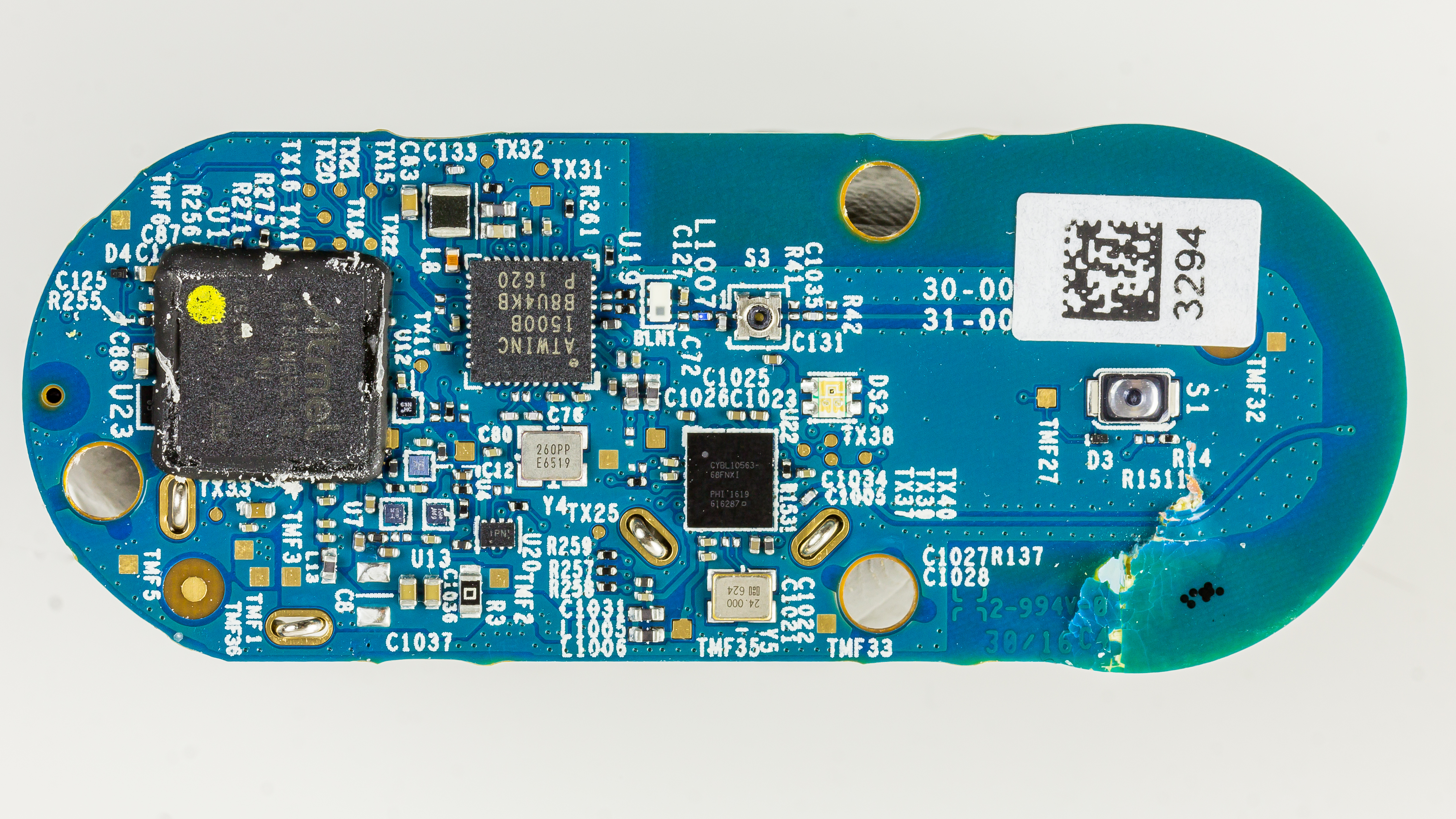
An Amazon Dash button with the cover removed and circuit board visible

Amazon Dash was a consumer goods ordering service which uses proprietary devices and APIs for ordering goods over the Internet.

Amazon Dash consisted of multiple components, which include:

- the Amazon Dash Wand, a Wi-Fi connected barcode scanner and voice command device, used to reorder consumer goods around the house, integrating with AmazonFresh;
- the Amazon Dash Button, a small consumer electronic device that can be placed around the house and programmed to order consumer goods such as disinfectant wipes or paper towels; and
- the Amazon Dash Replenishment Service, which allows manufacturers to add a physical button or auto-detection capability to their devices to reorder supplies from Amazon when necessary.

== Barcode scanner ==
The Amazon Dash Wand (originally branded simply Amazon Dash) was announced in April 2014. It is a Wi-Fi connected device that allows users to build a shopping list by scanning bar codes and saying product names out loud. It connects directly with AmazonFresh, the company's online grocery delivery service. The website for Amazon Dash highlights benefits such as "never forget an item again" and suggests users keep the device on the kitchen counter or refrigerator so that every member of the family can add items to its grocery list.

On June 15, 2017, a new version of the scanner was announced by Amazon. The new version has Alexa built in, allowing users to ask for recipes and order from Amazon Prime Now.

== Replenishment service ==
The Dash Button and Dash Replenishment Service (DRS) were introduced by Amazon.com on March 31, 2015. Due to the timing of the announcement, there were a number of news stories questioning whether the Dash Button was an early April Fools joke.

== Roll-out and response ==
Initially, the Dash buttons were made available by invitation to Amazon Prime members who were invited to request the devices. The devices received mixed reviews from critics and reporters upon release, and have been parodied online. In Germany, the product was deemed illegal due to insufficient information about the price of the product being given at the time of purchase. This was allegedly part of a larger dispute between Amazon and Germany, where Amazon battles with unions and is under investigation for attempting to monopolize the country.

Amazon Dash Buttons initially partnered with more than 100 brands.

== Alternative use ==
In August 2015, within a week of the first shipment of Dash buttons to Amazon Prime members, Popular Mechanics reported that it had already been reprogrammed for use as a push-button data tracker. Computer scientist Edward Benson published instructions online to turn it into a wireless spreadsheet entry device, or a trigger for any other API endpoint.

By May 2016, Consumers' Research pointed out that Amazon Dash was being reprogrammed to use for other purposes such as ordering pizza, tracking time, and controlling lights and outlets in households configured to respond to such commands. In response, Amazon introduced a programmer-friendly, but more expensive button in the form of an "Internet of Things Dash Button" which allows programmers to make programming modifications to the device.

== End of service ==
On March 1, 2019, Amazon discontinued the series, claiming that it was made unnecessary due to automatic reordering and product subscriptions. Additionally, Amazon claimed that voice-activated shopping on Alexa products would succeed the buttons. On June 22, 2020, Amazon sent an email to owners of the Dash Wand stating that they would be disconnected in a month on July 21, 2020 with no recourse other than to use other Amazon devices, and directed owners to simply recycle their devices.
