= Protolabs Network =

Online manufacturing platform

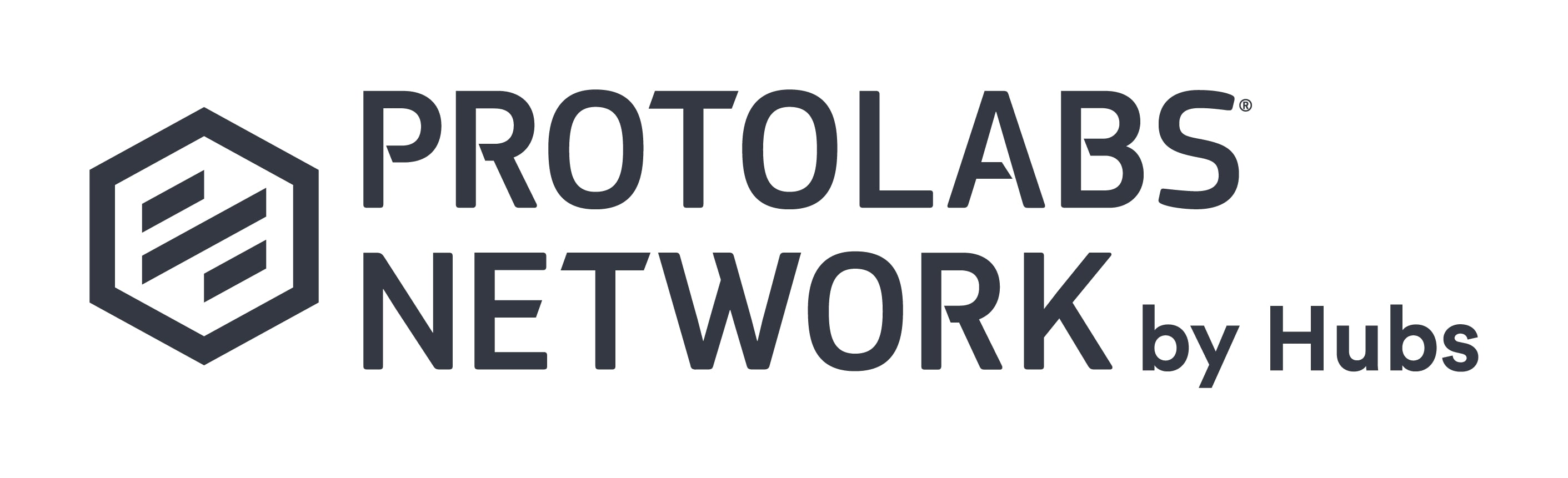
- Formerly: 3D Hubs
- Industry: Manufacturing, 3D printing, CNC machining, injection moulding
- Founded: 2013; 13 years ago
- Founder: Bram de Zwart; Brian Garret; Filemon Schöffer
- Headquarters: Amsterdam, Netherlands
- Owner: Protolabs
- Number of employees: 140
- Website: www.hubs.com

Protolabs Network, (formerly 3D Hubs), is a B2B online manufacturing marketplace that provides businesses on-demand access to a global network of more than 250 manufacturing partners. It is part of Protolabs’ global manufacturing services, offering 3D printing, CNC machining, injection molding and sheet metal fabrication.

Founded as "3D Hubs", and later renamed "Hubs", it was acquired by Protolabs in 2021, and is primarily used by designers and engineers. In 2024, it renamed the platform Protolabs Network.

== Company ==
Protolabs Network was founded in Amsterdam in April 2013, as 3D Hubs, by Bram de Zwart and Brian Garret, with Filemon Schöffer. In 2021, it was the world's largest peer-to-peer network of 3D printing services.

In January 2021, Minnesota-based Protolabs, a publicly traded custom part manufacturer, acquired the company for $280 million in cash and stock, plus $50 million for reaching targets based on performance. The subsidiary then rebranded to Hubs. In January 2024, Hubs again rebranded, as Protolabs Network.

Protolabs’ technology-enabled factories in the US and Europe integrate more than 250 vetted manufacturers.

== Industry reports and initiatives ==
The company releases regular reports on leading trends and developments within the manufacturing industry, including the 3D Printing Trend Report and the Supply Chain Resilience Report.

Hubs sponsors a yearly student grant that supports engineering students in the development of innovative projects. In 2020, Hubs launched the COVID-19 Manufacturing fund, to help fund and manufacture vital protective equipment such as face shields for hospitals in need during the onset of the COVID-19 pandemic.

== Awards ==
- In 2014, Wired UK named 3D Hubs Startup of the Week.
- In 2018, 3D Hubs won the Dutch market challenger award by Sprout.
- In 2019 and 2020, Hubs was named amongst the Deloitte Fast 50 list of fastest growing technology companies in the Netherlands.
- In 2020, 3D Hubs CEO Bram de Zwart was named in Business Insider's list of 100 leaders transforming business in Europe.

== See also ==
- 3D Printing
- 3D Printing Marketplace
