= Ear-EEG =

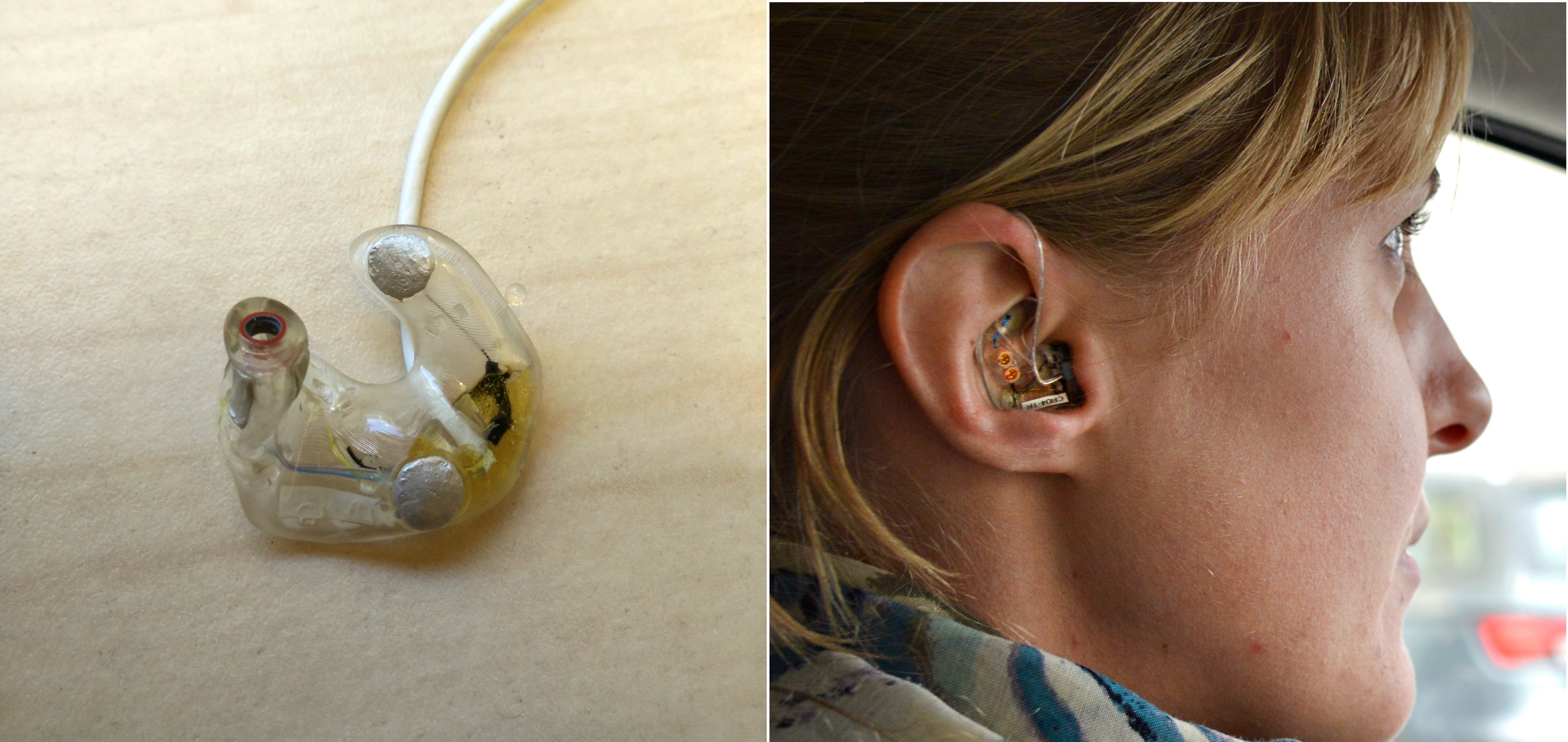
- Examples of in-ear EEG mounts. On the left is seen a single earplug (right ear), on the right is seen a right earplug in ear
- Purpose: measure dynamics of brain activity

Ear-EEG is a method for measuring dynamics of brain activity through the minute voltage changes observable on the skin, typically by placing electrodes on the scalp. In ear-EEG, the electrodes are exclusively placed in or around the outer ear, resulting in both a much greater invisibility and wearer mobility compared to full scalp electroencephalography (EEG), but also significantly reduced signal amplitude, as well as reduction in the number of brain regions in which activity can be measured. It may broadly be partitioned into two groups: those using electrode positions exclusively within the concha and ear canal, and those also placing electrodes close to the ear, usually hidden behind the ear lobe. Generally speaking, the first type will be the most invisible, but also offer the most challenging (noisy) signal. Ear-EEG is a good candidate for inclusion in a hearable device, however, due to the high complexity of ear-EEG sensors, this has not yet been done.

== History ==
Ear-EEG was first described in a patent application, and subsequently in other publications. Since then, it has grown to be an endeavor spread across multiple research groups and collaborations, as well as private companies. Notable incarnations of the technology are the cEEGrid (see picture to the right) and the custom 3D-printed ear plugs from NeuroTechnology Lab (see picture above). Attempts at creating in-ear generic earpieces are also known to be under way.

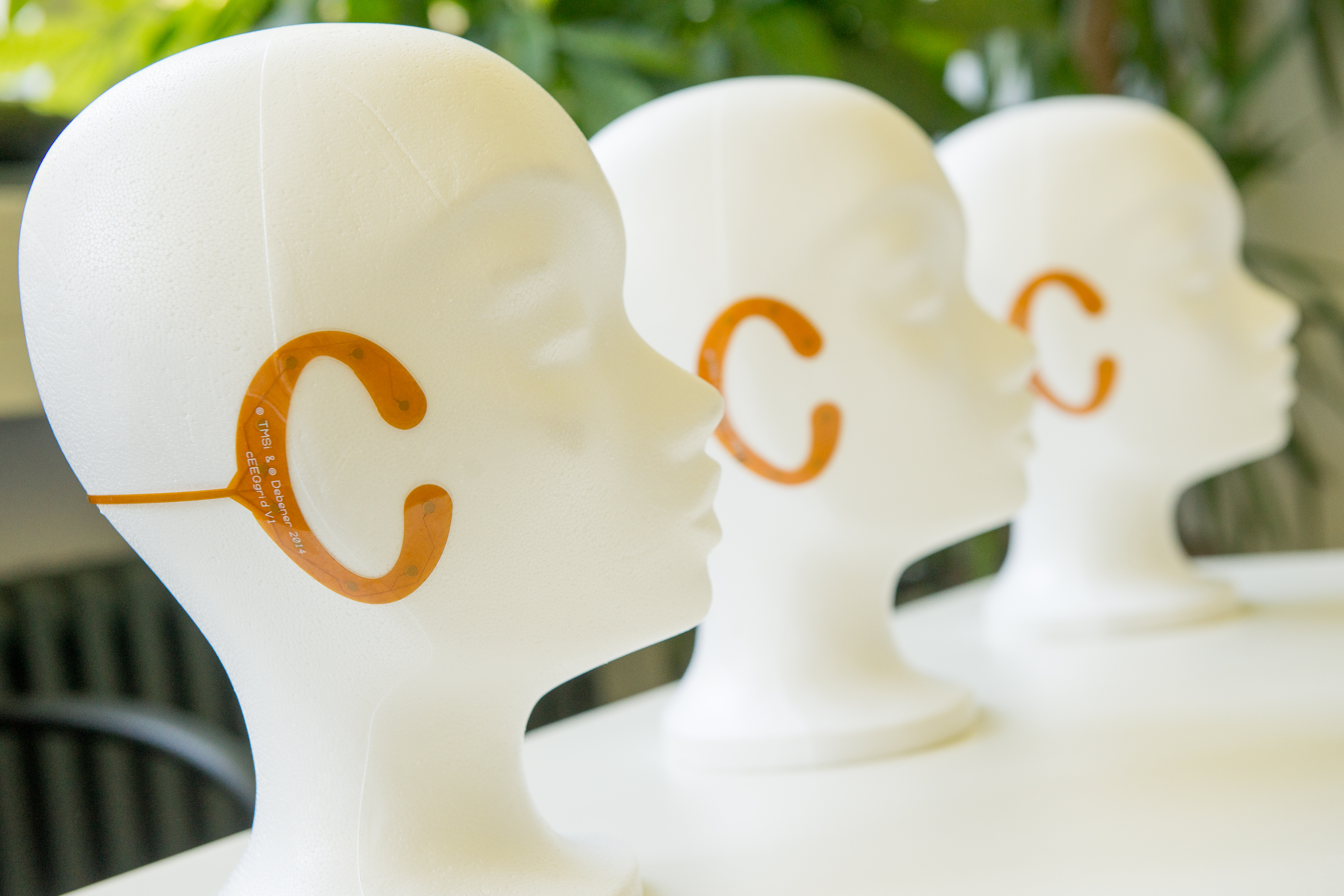
Demonstration of multiple cEEGrids on dummy heads

== Uses in research ==
It is possible to think of multiple research areas in which an unobtrusive and invisible EEG system would be beneficial. Good examples are in studies of group dynamics or didactics, in which cases it would be very valuable to be able to monitor the effect of various events on individuals, while still letting them experience said events unfettered. And in this context, it is very important to perform detailed comparisons between ear-EEG and regular scalp EEG, as results need to be comparable across platforms. This has been done in multiple papers. In these it has been found that ear-EEG measurements are comparable to scalp EEG in the frequency domain; however, the time domain activity recorded by the two systems are notably different. Several papers have presented models (i.e. ear-EEG forward models) of how the electric field from electrical sources in the brain maps to potentials in the ear. The ear-EEG forward models enable prediction of the potentials in the ear for a specific neural phenomenon, and can be used to improve the understanding of which neural sources that can be measured with ear-EEG

Example of a scalp topography (middle) with corresponding ear-topographies (left and right). The topographies show the potential on the scalp and in the ears for a single dipolar brain source and were calculated using an individualized ear-EEG forward model as described by Kappel et al.

== Dry-contact electrode ear-EEG ==
Dry-contact electrode ear-EEG is a method in which no gel is applied between the electrode and the skin. This method generally improves the comfort and user-friendliness for long-term and real-life recordings. Because no gel is applied to the electrodes, the user can potentially mount the ear-EEG device without assistance.

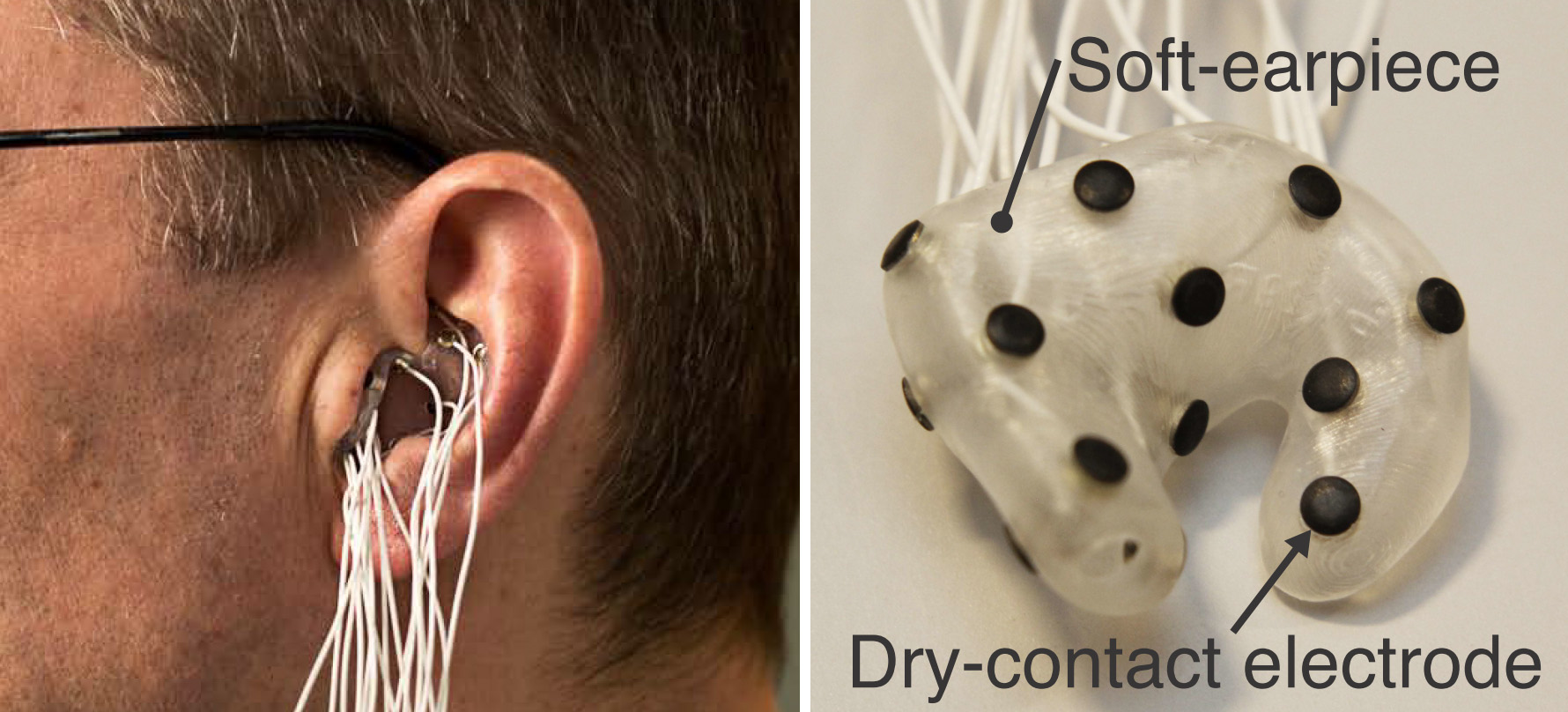
Example of high-density ear-EEG. On the left is seen a high-density ear-EEG earpiece mounted in the ear. On the right is a picture of a high-density ear-EEG soft-earpiece with dry-contact electrodes.

Dry-contact electrode ear-EEG have been used to perform high-density ear-EEG recordings, which enable mapping of the brain response on a topographic 3D map of the ear (Ear-topographies).

When using dry-contact electrodes, the interface between the skin and the electrodes are mainly defined by the electrochemical properties of the electrode material, the mechanical design of the electrode, the surface properties of the electrode, and how the electrode is retained against the skin. To improve these aspects for ear-EEG, nanostructured electrodes and soft earpieces have been proposed. The electronic instrumentation must also be carefully designed to accommodate dry-contact electrodes.

== Real-life monitoring ==
The state of the human brain is influenced by the surrounding environment, and the response from the brain is influenced by the state of the brain. Thus, restricting brain research to a laboratory represents a fundamental limitation. Real-life monitoring of ear-EEG overcome this limitation, and enable research of evoked responses and spontaneous responses related to everyday life situations.

The compact and discreet nature of ear-EEG devices makes it suitable for real-life EEG monitoring. A general problem when recordings EEG is the interference arising from noise and artifacts. In a laboratory environment, artifacts and interference can largely be avoided or controlled, in real-life this is challenging. Physiological artifacts are a category of artifacts with physiological origin, in contrast to artifacts arising from electrical interference. A study of physiological artifacts in ear-EEG found artifacts from jaw muscle contractions to be higher for ear-EEG compared to the scalp EEG, whereas eye-blinking did not influence the ear-EEG.

== Sleep monitoring ==
A promising use case is in long-term sleep monitoring, where there is presently a need for a more user friendly (and cheaper) alternative to the gold standard polysomnography. Innovation Fund Denmark recently funded a large project on using ear-EEG for sleep monitoring, in a collaboration between industry and Aarhus University in Denmark, however, development of an ear-EEG based sleep monitor is a global endeavor, with other prominent examples taking place at the University of Colorado, Imperial College London and the University of Oxford.

== Possible commercial uses ==
Despite the lack of ear-EEG products on the market, several companies have revealed investments in ear-EEG technology. Foremost of these are the hearing aid producers Oticon and Widex and its sister company T&W Engineering, who are looking into hearing-aid applications, the feasibility of which there appears to be some support for, and a hypoglycemia alarm.

Other potential use cases which are known to have been explored are driver drowsiness detection, BCI and biometric identification.
