= Lenovo Smart Assistant =

Voice-enabled smart speaker developed by Lenovo

- Developer: Lenovo
- Manufacturer: Lenovo
- Type: Smart voice-enabled wireless speaker
- Released: May 2017; 9 years ago (U.S. release)
- Introductory price: US$129.99
- Memory: 2 GB
- Storage: 8 GB
- Input: Voice command
- Connectivity: Wi-Fi and Bluetooth
- Weight: 1.59 lb (0.72 kg)
- Website: www3.lenovo.com/us/en/virtual-reality-and-smart-devices/smart-home/smart-home-series/Smart-Assistant/p/99SD9EI1SA1

The Lenovo Smart Assistant is a Google Assistant-enabled smart speaker developed by Lenovo. The device was announced at CES 2017 and released to the U.S. market in May 2017. A Harman Kardon version of the speaker was also announced at the event. The speaker uses the Amazon's Alexa voice service, and can be controlled through the Alexa companion app. The inside of the device includes eight microphones, a W-Fi chip, Intel Celeron N3060 processor, and a large speaker. The device shell is white, with a gray, green or orange woven overlay over the speaker.
