= Recombinetics =

Bio-engineering company in Saint Paul, United States

Recombinetics is a St. Paul, Minnesota-based bio-engineering company. The company was founded in 2008, and has since raised more than $34 million from private investors. Mark Platt is the CEO. The company develops gene-editing applications for animal agriculture and biomedical research, and has been known for work on hornless cattle and research involving pigs.

In November 2024, Recombinetics filed for Chapter 11 bankruptcy protection. The company was acquired by Trans Ova Genetics for $4.1 million.

== Products ==
It is known for developing genetically engineered hornless cattle, and is working on growing human organs and tissues in pigs. While it created a cow that does not grow horns, during the creation process it also added genes from bacteria that could produce antibiotic resistance. This occurred despite the CEO claiming that they had proof there were no other effects than the horns not being present. Due to the bacterial DNA, it is unlikely that the animals will get FDA approval, and a number of them have been killed and the bodies burned.
