= Near-field magnetic induction communication =

Communication technology

A near-field magnetic induction (NFMI) communication system is a short range Wireless physical layer that communicates by coupling a tight, low-power, non-propagating magnetic field between devices. The concept is for a transmitter coil in one device to modulate a magnetic field which is measured by means of a receiver coil in another device.

== Background: technical concepts ==
NFMI systems differ from other wireless communications in that most conventional wireless RF systems use an antenna to generate, transmit, and propagate an electromagnetic wave. In these types of systems all of the transmission energy is designed to radiate into free space. This type of transmission is referred to as "far-field."

According to Maxwell's equation for a radiating wire, the power density of far-field transmissions attenuates or rolls off at a rate proportional to the inverse of the range to the second power (1/r^{2}) or −20 dB per decade. This slow attenuation over distance allows far-field transmissions to communicate effectively over a long range. The properties that make long range communication possible are a disadvantage for short range communication systems.

The NFMI system uses a short range (less than 2 meters).

The standard modulation schemes used in typical RF communications (amplitude modulation, phase modulation, and frequency modulation) can be used in near-field magnetic induction system

NFMI systems are designed to contain transmission energy within the localized magnetic field. This magnetic field energy resonates around the communication system, but does not radiate into free space. This type of transmission is referred to as "near-field." The power density of near-field transmissions is extremely restrictive and attenuates or rolls off at a rate proportional to the inverse of the range to the sixth power (1/r^{6}) or −60 dB per decade.

In current commercial implementations of near-field communications, the most commonly used carrier frequency is 13.56 MHz and has a wavelength (λ) of 22.1 meters. The crossover point between near-field and far-field occurs at approximately λ/2π. At this frequency the crossover occurs at 3.52 meters, at which point the propagating energy from the NFMI system conforms to the same propagation rules as any far-field system; rolling off at −20 dB per decade. At this distance the propagated energy levels are −40 dB to −60 dB (10,000 to 1,000,000 times) lower than an equivalent intentional far-field system.

== Use ==
Near-field magnetic induction technology has been in use by the company FreeLinc, using NFMI to create a secure wireless communication between two-way radio accessories. This is done by creating a magnetic communication "bubble" around headsets, speaker-microphones and radios. This magnetic bubble has a radius of approximately 1.5 meters, is immune from radio frequency (RF) interference and virtually secure from eavesdropping. An eavesdropper would have to be standing next to the radio, within the magnetic bubble, to intercept wireless transmissions to and from a microphone or headset.

NFMI was used in the DEF CON 27 conference badge to allow two-way communication between the badges.

== See also ==
- Near-field communication, an application of simplified NFMI technology
