= Anker =

Chinese electronics brand

Anker Innovations Co., Ltd.

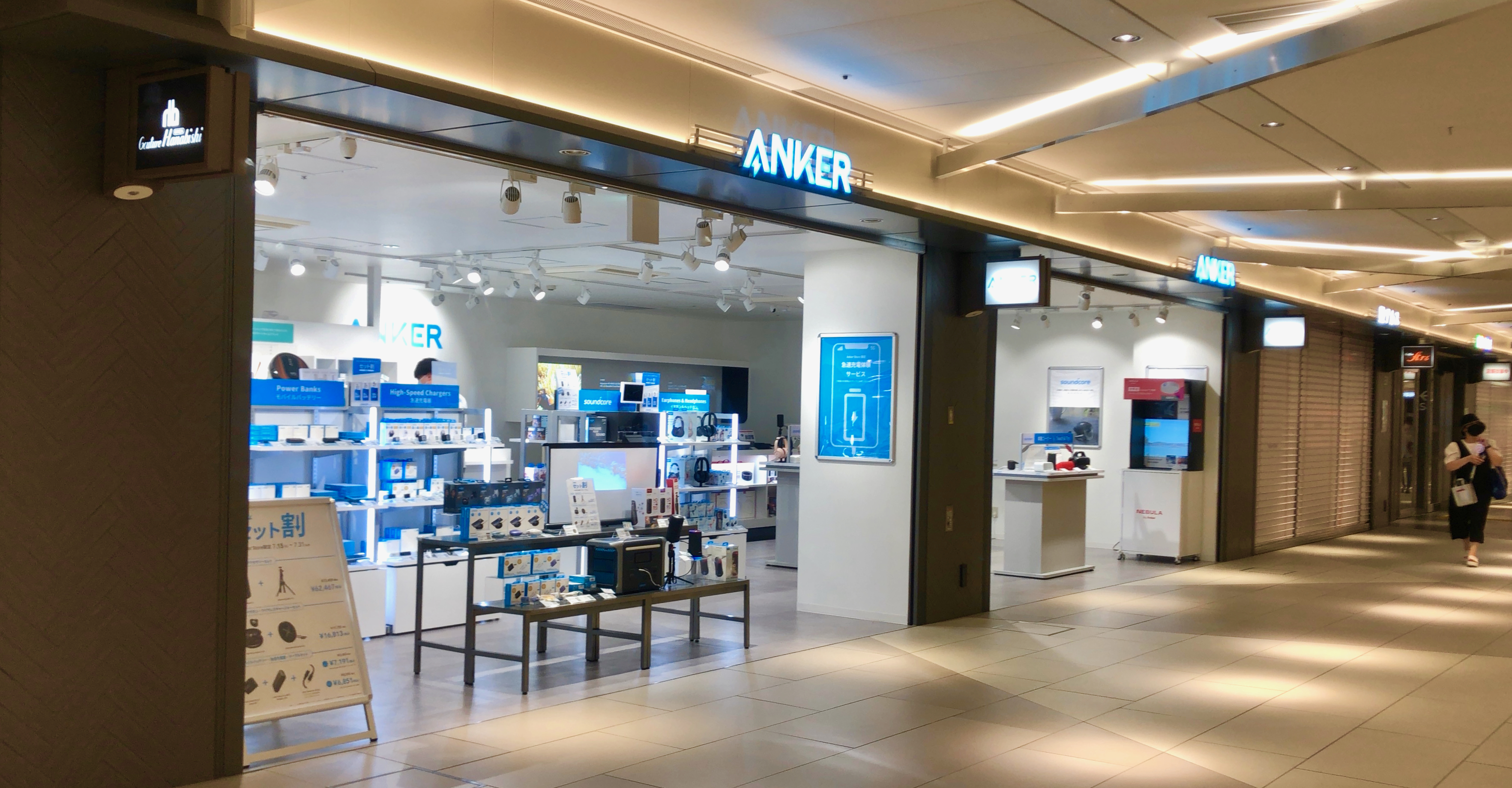
- Native name: 安克创新科技股份有限公司
- Formerly: Oceanwing
- Type: Public
- Traded as: SZSE: 300866
- Industry: Electronics
- Founded: September 2011; 15 years ago
- Founder: Steven Yang
- Headquarters: Changsha, Hunan, China
- Area served: Worldwide
- Products: Smart hardware
- Brands: Anker; Anker SOLIX; eufy; eufyMake; soundcore; Roav; Nebula
- Subsidiaries: Anker Innovations Technology Co., Ltd.; Anker Innovations Limited; Anker Technology (UK) Ltd.; Shenzhen Oceanwing Smart Innovations Technology Co., Ltd; Fantasia Trading LLC
- Website: anker.com (retail) anker-in.com (corporate)

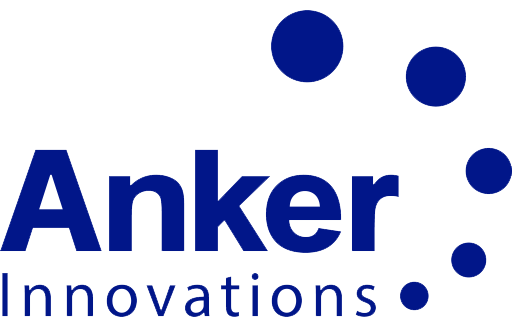
Logo used until 2025

Anker Innovations Co., Ltd, (Note: Chinese: 安克创新; pinyin: Ānkè Chuàngxīn) commonly known as Anker, (Note: Chinese: 安克; pinyin: Ānkè) is a Chinese electronics manufacturer based in Changsha, Hunan, China. The company's products are phone chargers, car chargers, power banks, earbuds, headphones, speakers, data hubs, 3D printers, charging cables, torches (flashlights), screen protectors, portable power stations, home solar batteries, and smart home devices.

== History ==
Anker was founded in 2011 by Steven Yang in Shenzhen, Guangdong, but the company moved its headquarters to Changsha, Hunan. In 2011, Anker expanded its focus from replacement laptop batteries to smartphone battery chargers, wall adapters, portable power banks, and conferencing gear. In early 2014, Anker Innovations hired Zhao Dongping, Google's then-head of sales in China, who became president in 2020.

== Availability ==
Anker maintains subsidiaries in Japan, Singapore, the United States, and the United Kingdom. Until 2016, Anker products were almost exclusively sold on Amazon Marketplace and Newegg. Anker products are also sold in big-box stores such as Best Buy, Target, and Kohl's. They are also available on e-commerce websites such as Shopee, Amazon, eBay, and other third-party websites authorized by Anker.

== Brands and products ==
=== Anker ===
Anker began producing portable power banks and USB chargers before expanding into car chargers, wireless chargers, and data cables. Anker's main product lines include Anker Prime, Anker Nano, and Anker Zolo, covering wall chargers, power banks, travel adapters, and accessories.

In September 2026, the company announced that it was unifying all five of its sub-brands under the name "Anker".

=== Anker SOLIX ===
Anker SOLIX is a sub-brand for residential and portable energy products, spanning home energy storage, portable power stations and balcony solar systems.

In 2023, Anker launched the Anker SOLIX brand (it replaces the PowerHouse brand launched in 2016) for residential energy products, introducing the Solarbank E1600 balcony system and the SOLIX F3800 portable power station, which raised over US$5 million through crowdfunding. The SOLIX X1 home energy-storage unit launched in 2024 and received a Red Dot Design Award. In January 2026, Anker SOLIX launched the E10, a modular whole-home backup power system for the U.S. market, with battery capacity expandable from 6 kWh to 90 kWh. The system supports solar charging and can be paired with an optional tri-fuel generator.

=== eufy ===
eufy was launched in 2016 and focuses on smart home products, including robotic vacuum cleaners, home security cameras, smart lighting, and other Internet of Things (IoT) devices. The brand's products are sold through online platforms and retail stores worldwide.

By 2020, the brand had expanded into home security systems, smart lighting, and health devices such as smart scales. Products include the personal 3D texture UV printer EufyMake E1 launched through Kickstarter, NVR security system S4 Max, and eufy SpaceView.

The company also entered the 3D printing market under the AnkerMake brand, debuting with the M5 model, which was funded through a Kickstarter campaign. Two models, the M5 and M5C, were released before Anker discontinued its 3D printer line in 2025. The company subsequently introduced eufyMake, a creation-tools line centered on UV flatbed printers such as the E1 model, shifting its 3D printing portfolio toward UV printing technology. Sales of 3D printing filament and accessories continue on the eufyMake website.

=== soundcore ===
soundcore is an audio sub-brand of Anker Innovations that was established on April 25, 2018. It produces Bluetooth earbuds, over-ear and open-ear headphones, portable speakers, and smartglasses. Anker began offering audio products in 2014 and launched soundcore in 2018 following the success of its wireless audio devices. The brand gained recognition with releases such as the Liberty Air 2 Pro earbuds with active noise cancellation and the Liberty 3 Pro released later in 2021. By 2025, the brand had expanded in markets such as Japan, Germany, and the UK.

soundcore products include true wireless earbuds, over-ear noise-cancelling headphones, open-ear earbuds, sleep earbuds, and Bluetooth speakers. True wireless earbuds include the Liberty, Life, and P series, featuring adaptive noise cancellation and core Astria Coaxial Acoustic Architecture (ACAA). The headphones lineup comprises the Space and Life Q series. Sleep earbuds like Sleep A20 and A30. The Bluetooth speakers are in the Flare, Rave, and Boom series. In 2026, Anker introduced the Anker Thus compute-in-memory chip, based on a NOR flash architecture designed for on-device audio processing. It was first integrated into the new soundcore Liberty 5 Pro Max.

In December 2024, the U.S. Consumer Product Safety Commission (CPSC) announced the recall of approximately 69,000 units of the Anker Soundcore A3102 Bluetooth Speaker and Anker PowerConf A3302 Bluetooth Speaker, citing a risk of battery overheating and fire hazards. An additional 9,764 units were recalled in Canada. Consumers were advised to stop using the devices and obtain a replacement through Anker's official recall programme.

In August 2025, Nebula (Anker’s projector brand) was merged into the Soundcore brand to unify its audio and visual products. The first device introduced under the combined brand was the Soundcore Nebula X1 Pro.

=== ROAV ===
Automotive brand launched in 2016.

== Controversies ==
One of Anker's sub-brands, eufy, claimed that all data recorded by their webcams was stored locally, inaccessible via the cloud or to anyone but the owner. However, security researcher Paul Moore found out that images and videos were uploaded to eufy's servers leased through AWS. Additionally, these images were tagged with user data. Even after deleting the images and his eufy account, Moore found that the images remained on eufy's AWS servers. The controversy highlighted the data security challenges facing smart home devices and sparked scrutiny from regulators. An update to eufy's website reaffirmed its commitment to privacy, emphasizing local storage and end-to-end encryption. This led to several sponsored entities, such as YouTube channel Linus Tech Tips, dropping Anker as a sponsor. In December 2022, The Verge reported that eufy had drastically changed its "privacy commitment" page, removing many of their previous statements on the privacy aspects of its cameras.

Since 2023, Anker has recalled multiple models of their power banks due to posing a fire hazard. In June 2025, Anker provided a voluntary recall for five models of their PowerCore power banks due to a potential manufacturing issue involving lithium-ion battery cells supplied by a single vendor. The U.S. Consumer Product Safety Commission provided an update in September 2025, stating the firm received 33 reports of fire and explosion incidents and that about 481,000 units were affected.

In September 2025, John Moolenaar, the chair of the House Select Committee on China, asked the U.S. Department of Commerce to investigate Anker for potential security risks and tariff evasion.

== Gallery ==
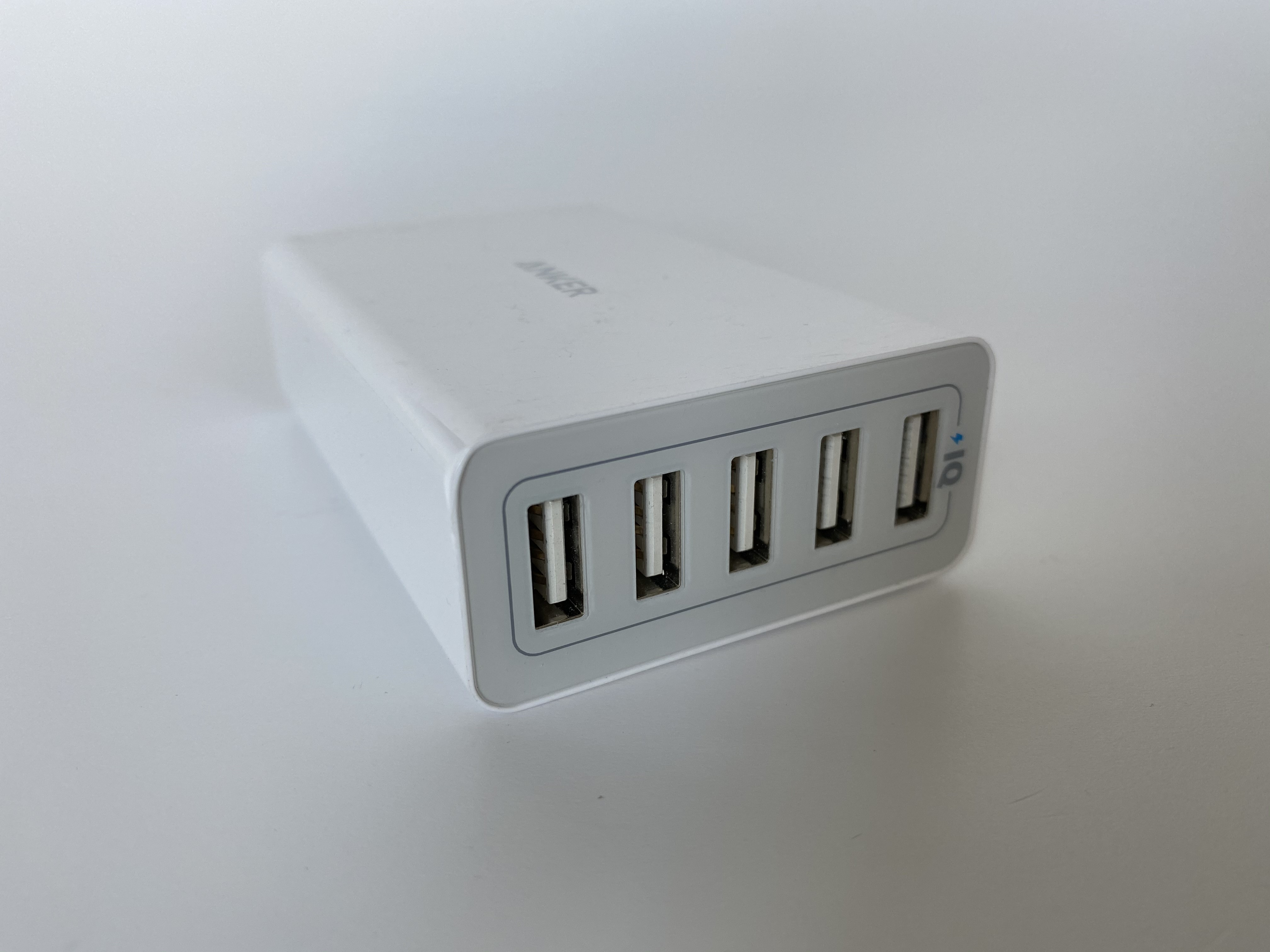
Anker PowerPort, a fast USB charger with 5 ports

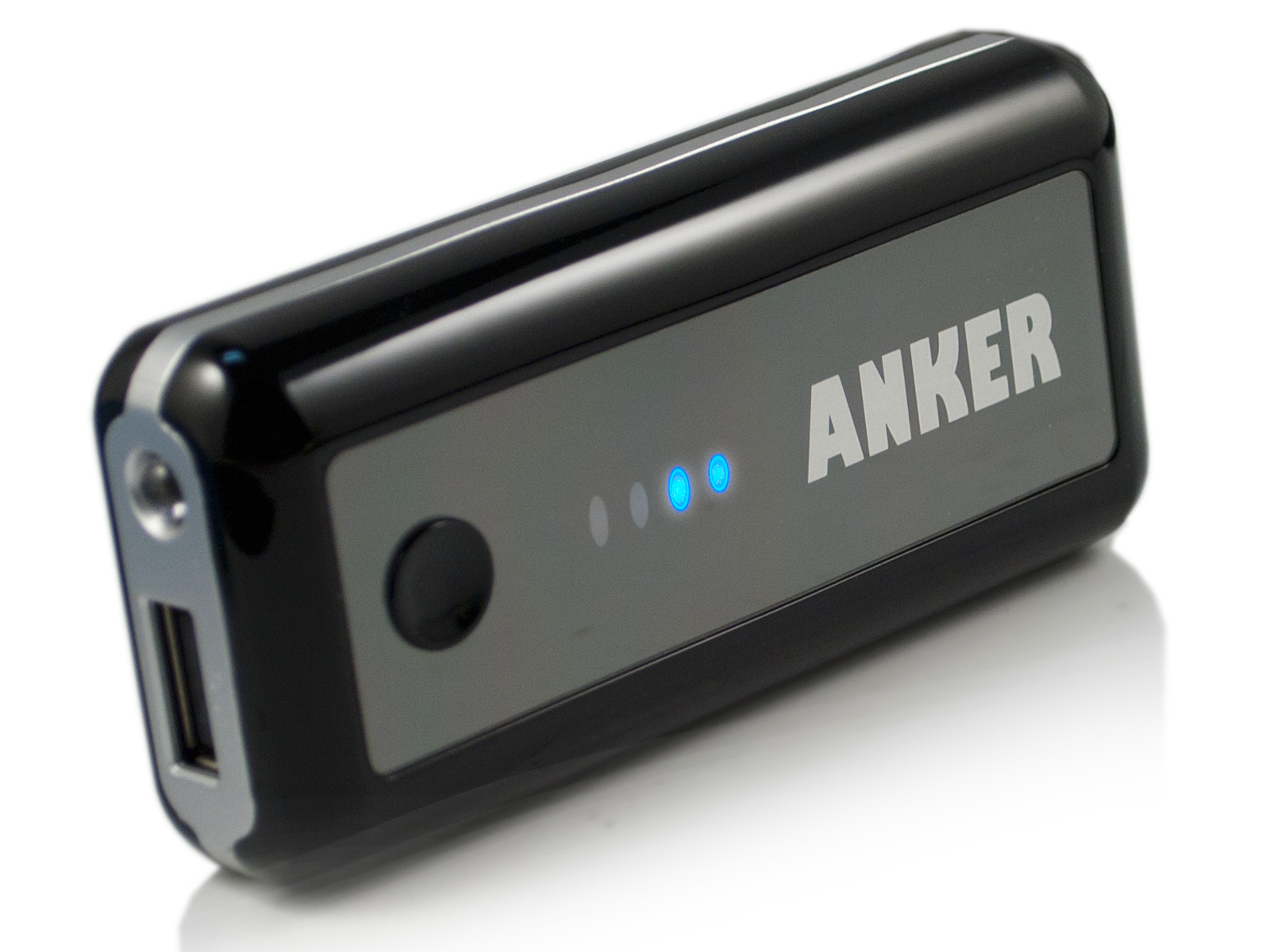
Anker Astro, a mobile battery charger introduced in 2011

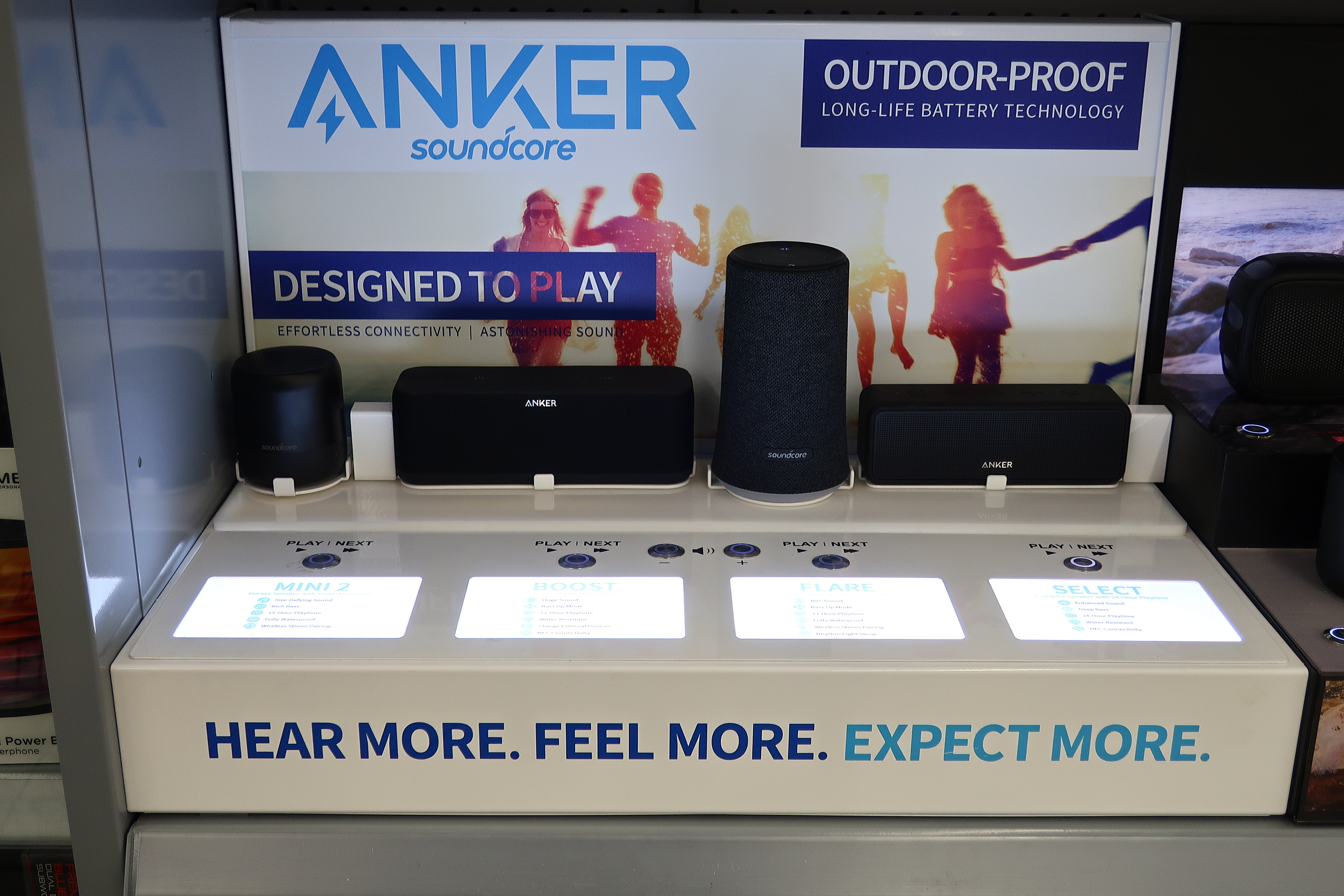
An Anker Soundcore interactive speaker display

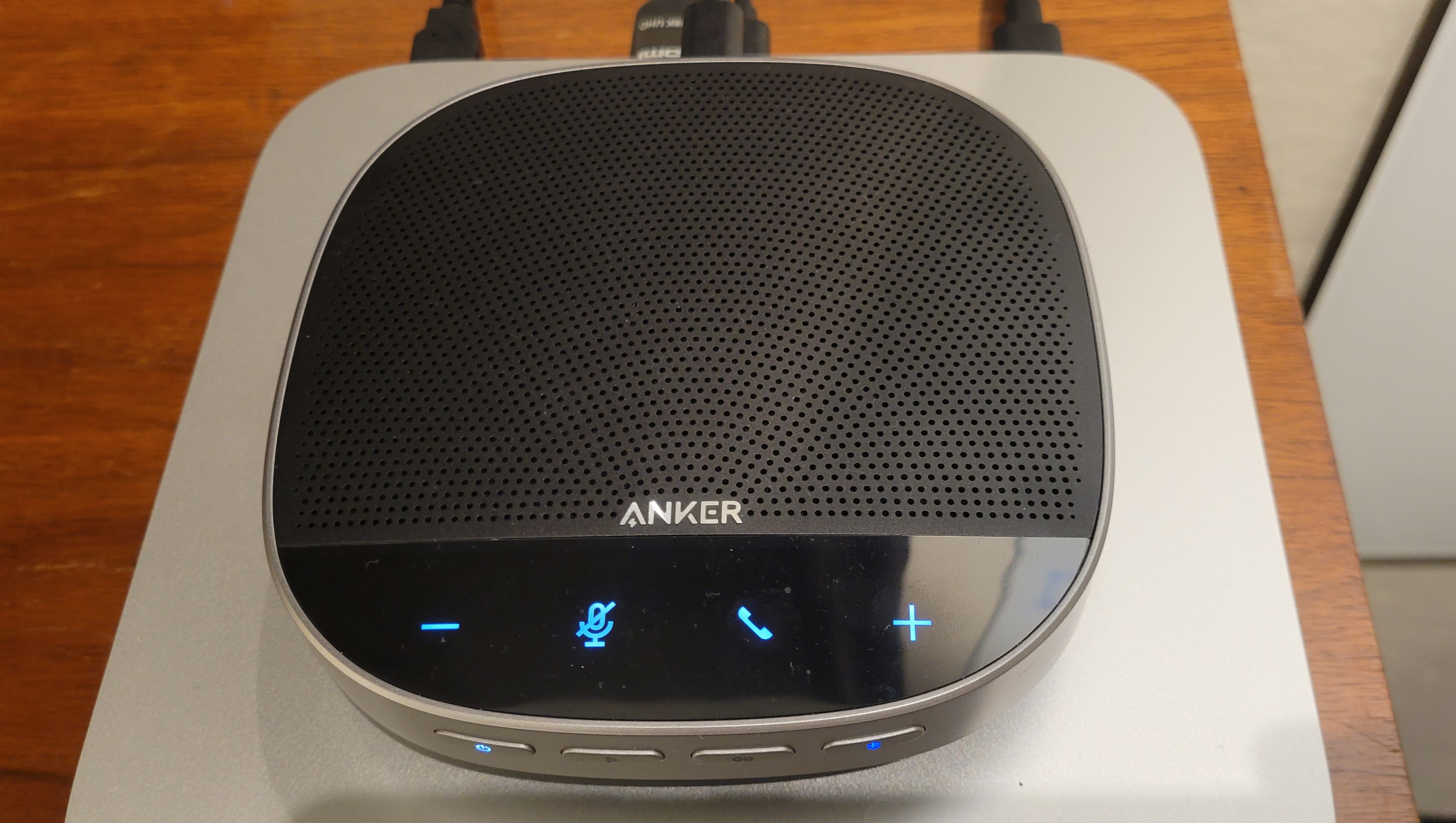
Anker PowerConf S500 Speakerphone

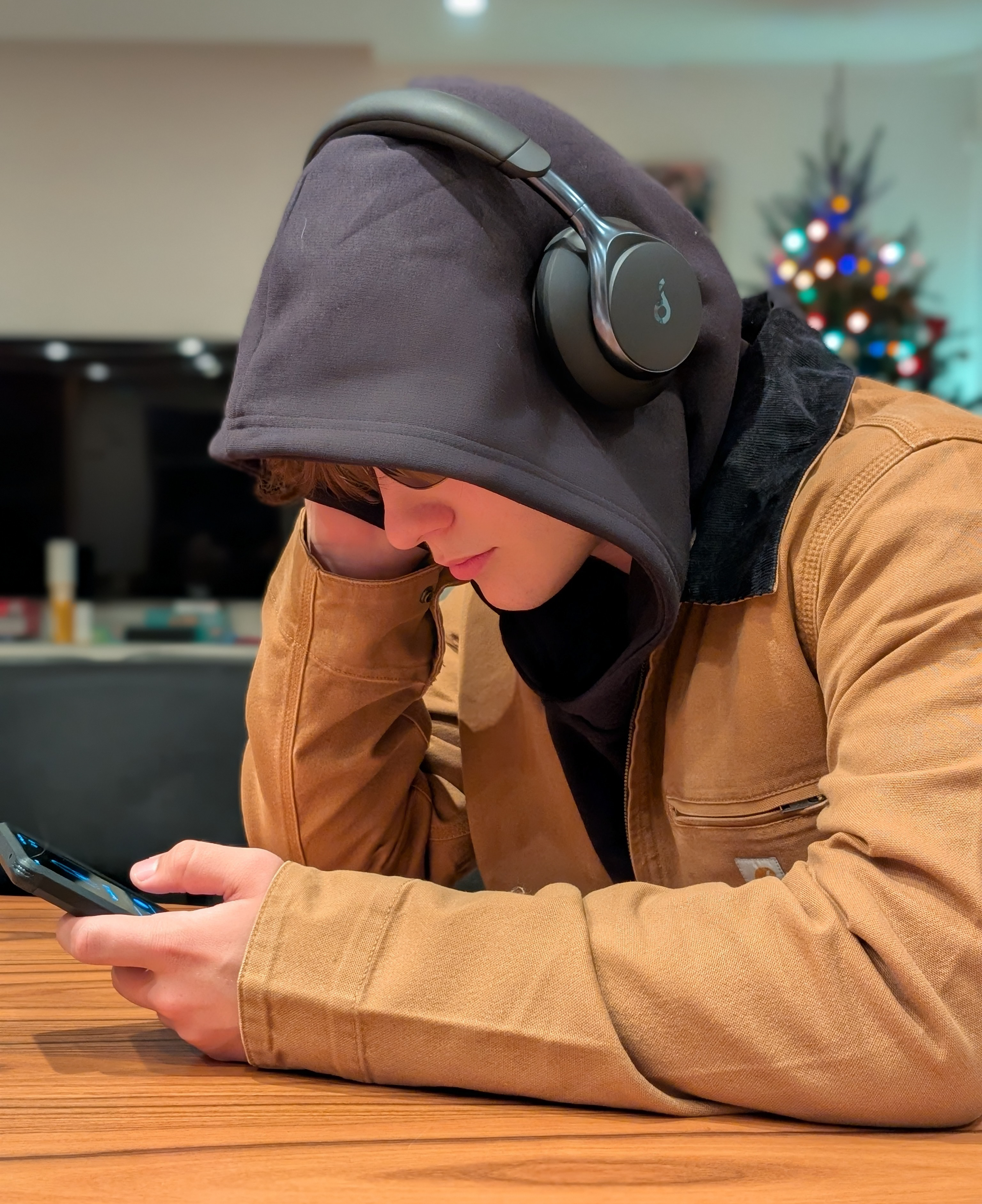
Anker Soundcore Space One
