= Martian Watches =

Smart watch brand

Martian Watches was a brand of smart watch founded in 2007 in the United States by SilverPlus, Inc., an American company headquartered in Irvine, California. Martian Watches allow for hands-free use of mobile phones via short-distance wireless communication. Using Bluetooth and voice recognition technology, users can take calls, listen to or send text messages, see caller ID information, and send text using speech synthesis. The Martian watch is reportedly the first watch to utilize voice commands.

== Features ==
Martian Watches were produced in several styles, each with an analog time display, a small OLED display screen, a speaker, and a noise-cancelling microphone. The small OLED displays scrolling text which can show caller ID information, text messages, and other information such as social media notifications. In addition, the watch can be used to trigger the shutter of the mobile phone's camera. The watches utilize Bluetooth 4.0, which supports regular Bluetooth, as well as Bluetooth low energy. The analog watch portion of Martian Watches is powered by a watch battery, and there is a side-mounted micro USB port for the rechargeable battery that handles the phone functions, in addition to an accelerometer.

== Awards ==
Martian Watches was named a CNET "Best of CES Finalist" at CES 2013, and was selected for a Popular Mechanics CES 2013 Editor's Choice Award. In addition, the Edison Award for Productivity Tools was awarded to Martian Watches in April 2013.

== Kickstarter campaign ==
Martian successfully launched their wireless smartphone-connected watches via the Kickstarter crowd funding platform on August 16, 2012, and the first watches were delivered to customers in early February 2013.

A new Kickstarter campaign in 2018 has resulted in significant customer complaints, with users either not receiving their goods or receiving watches which do not work as advertised. The company has so far not responded to customer criticism and it seems that the Martian office phones are cut off, with support tickets also going unanswered.

Update (May 23, 2018): Martian issued a statement to Kickstarter backers saying that after shipping the first batch of about 480 watches, they lack the funding to continue. They tried to acquire more funding to cover their costs (amounting upwards of $15,000,000) but they were unable to get funding. They are closing the company and liquidating their assets to pay investors. They will be issuing another update to Kickstarter backers in about 30 days, when they decide what they will do to repay their debts and issue refunds to their backers. Many backers are angry at their lack of financial planning as they greatly mislead users by setting a $30,000 goal and raised over ten times this amount, yet they are $15,000,000 short of fulfilling the orders. As this goes against Kickstarter terms of service by not providing a product or a refund, users await their next update in the coming months.

== SilverPlus ==
SilverPlus, Inc., the U.S. distributor of Martian Watches, was established in 2007 by CEO Jeffrey Hsieh and CTO Dennis Kwan. The president of the company is Stan Kinsey.

=== Other products ===
In 2011, SilverPlus launched a home communication safety system for seniors called the SilverCare Personal Safety Alert Device that included a two-way voice communication watch/pendant and a base station connected to a home telephone line. The unique digital watch had a microphone and speaker that allowed the wearer, when within 100 feet of its base station, to call for help and speak to 9-1-1, family members, or a caregiver.

In August 2014 it was revealed that Martian was teaming up with Guess to launch a range of branded smartwatches.

== Closure ==
On 24 May 2018, it was announced that Martian Watches will cancel the mVoice G2 product and permanently cease operations after 11 years in business due to financial troubles.
