= Bragi (company) =

German technology company

- Industry: Consumer electronics
- Founded: 2013
- Founder: Nikolaj Hviid
- Headquarters: Munich, Germany
- Area served: World-wide
- Products: The Dash, The Headphone
- Website: bragi.com

Bragi is a German technology company headquartered in Munich, Germany, that designs, develops and sells Wireless smart earphones; the Bragi OS, the operating system for next-generation computing platforms; and the Bragi App for smartphones.

Bragi's hardware products include the computing platform The Dash. and The Headphone. While The Dash is a wireless smart earphone and personal assistant, The Headphone is a wireless earbud. The devices can be connected to other Bluetooth devices such as smartphones, tablets and computers to stream music or make phone calls. The Dash extends this functionality with Bragi OS, which brings features such as the training coach for running, swimming and cycling activities; the Bragi Kinetic User Interface (Bragi KUI) including the Head Gestures and MyTap (Beta) (now called Shortcut). By April 2017, Bragi sold more than 100,000 units, The Dash and The Headphone combined.

== History ==
Bragi was founded by the Danish entrepreneur Nikolaj Hviid in 2013. He created the concept for The Dash, after having been CEO of a design agency and head of design at Harman. The project was brought to life by a team consisting of Nikolaj himself, Josef Scheider, the former head of mechanical design at AKG, Arne Loermann, head of design, and Toby Martin, head of software at Bragi. A year later, the team had grown from 4 to 20 people.

After completing the feasibility study on The Dash, Bragi started a crowdfunding campaign for it between February 9, 2014, and March 31, 2014. The initial goal of US$260,000 was reached in less than 48 hours. In January 2015 "The Dash" was awarded the "Innovation Award" of the CES (Consumer Electronic Show) held in Las Vegas. Bragi brought The Dash to the market in late 2015.

By November 2015, Bragi reached 85 employees and received US$22 million investment from a group of American, European and Asian investors in November 2015.

On September 5, 2016, Bragi introduced 'The Headphone' as its second hardware product, 2 days before the introduction of the Apple AirPods. The Headphone is a stripped-down version of The Dash: it is a wireless earbud that can stream audio from any Bluetooth device letting the user take or make phone calls, or access the phone's digital assistant. Unlike The Dash, it lacks smart features such as fitness tracking, heart rate monitoring, gesture controls, and has no smartphone app.

During the launch event, Bragi introduced the Bragi OS 2.1. It brought many bug fixes in addition to new features such as the ability to synchronize The Dash with Google Fit and the Apple HealthKit, Touch Lock to prevent inadvertent gestures from impacting The Dash, shuffle option for the internal music player and on-demand heart rate tracking.

On November 21, 2016, Bragi released another software update for the Bragi OS, with version number 2.2. In this version, Bragi introduced its Kinetic User Interface (Bragi KUI). It is a technology that turns its user's body and movements into the user interface for operating Bragi products. Bragi KUI includes Head Gestures, where the user does head nods and shakes to give commands to The Dash, and MyTap (Beta) (later renamed as Shortcut), which recognizes a double tap on user's cheek and triggers user-defined actions. Moreover, in addition to general OS bug fixes, features such as the WindShield and Apple Watch connectivity; and improvements in the heart rate monitor have been introduced with this release.

On April 1, 2019, Bragi announced they were selling off their hardware business and stopped selling The Dash

On August 26, 2019, Bragi North America LLC faced bankruptcy proceedings.

Since then Bragi GmbH has supplied consultancy services to other wireless headphone manufacturers.

== Products ==
=== The Dash ===
Bragi brought The Dash to the market in late 2015. It is a touch- and head gesture-controlled truly wireless smart earphone and a personal assistant that comes pre-installed with Bragi OS. It can be used standalone or connected to a Bluetooth device that supports Bluetooth 4.0 or higher. It streams stereo audio through a Bluetooth connection or uses the internal music player on the right earphone with 4-GB flash storage to play back stereo audio. The audio playback time of The Dash is up to 3 hours depending on system usage and 15 hours on the go, while the charging case can recharge the device for five times. The Dash can be used in standalone mode, where the user wears only the right earphone and double taps on it to power on.

The Dash can track the user's movements and body metrics through its IMU. Additionally, it tracks its user's pace, steps, cadence, distance and measures heart rate and energy spent in calories while running, swimming and cycling. It provides real-time audio feedback during an activity. User's activity data can be transferred to a smartphone using the Bragi App.

In addition to being earphones, The Dash doubles as a Bluetooth Headset. Even though The Dash provides noise isolation, the wearer can choose to channel ambient sound into the headphone thanks to its audio transparency feature. With a swipe on the touch surface of The Dash, the user can enable or disable ambient sound to pass through.

==== User interface ====
The Dash has a touch-controlled interface on the lower half of each earphone, where the user can interact with the device through taps, swipes and holds. For instance, when not connected to a Bluetooth device, a short hold on the right Dash will start the internal music player menu. While in the menu, short holding again on the right Dash will exit the menu. A single tap on the right Dash plays or pauses the music from internal or external player. It is also possible to deactivate the touch interface with Touch Lock when the user is wearing hoodies, helmets or something similar when using The Dash to prevent unintended triggering of various events.

The right Dash earphone has touch gestures for the Bluetooth connectivity, phone call handling, internal and external audio player; while the left Dash earphone has touch gestures for the training coach for activities and time. In addition to the touch commands, Bragi OS brings the Bragi Kinetic User Interface (KUI) to Dash, which gives the user other ways of interaction with the device. For instance, it lets the user do head gestures and double taps on the cheek to interact with it the device.

==== Hardware ====
The Dash is an ARM-based completely wireless smart microcomputing platform equipped with a speaker, microphone, and various sensors such as high-resolution optical touch sensor, gyroscope, accelerometer and dual pulse oximeter sensors. It has a 100mAh Lithium-ion battery. It supports dual mode Bluetooth 4.0 and is audio compatible with classic Bluetooth devices and Bluetooth Low Energy. Left and right Dashes sync with each other using Near Field Magnetic Induction (NFMI).

=== The Headphone ===
The Headphone is the second hardware product introduced by Bragi on September 5, 2016. Users can connect The Headphone to any Bluetooth device and switch between music tracks, take phone calls, activate Audio Transparency and deliver voice commands. It comes with up to 6 hours of battery life per charge. Just like The Dash, the right and left earbuds of The Headphone communicate via NFMI technology. They do not feature touch interface, but have physical buttons instead. Finally, unlike The Dash's charger, the charger of The Headphone does not charge the earbuds.

=== Bragi OS ===
Bragi OS is an operating system developed by Bragi since 2014 and designed to run on the next-generation computing platforms. It comes pre-installed with The Dash bringing an audio player and smart features such as the training coach for running, swimming and cycling activities. The Kinetic User Interface (Bragi KUI) brings interaction by head nods and shakes and double taps on user's cheek (called Shortcut). The OS can also optimize the performance of The Dash through a calibration process.

==== Bragi OS features ====
===== Training coach =====
The training coach can be accessed by a short hold on the left Dash. It tracks its user's pace, steps, cadence, distance and measures heart rate and energy spent in calories while running, swimming and cycling. It provides acoustic feedback every 5 minutes, and the user can alternatively access the real-time performance through touch control on the left Dash. When the training is finished, the session data is sent to the Bragi smartphone app, where the user can review previous training performances.

===== Audio player =====
The audio player of Bragi OS can be accessed by a short hold on the right Dash. The internal audio player can play MP3 and AAC formats without DRM. The user can access the touch controls on the right Dash to play, pause, shuffle, fast forward, rewind the music and skip to the next or go to previous track. The interface can also be used to control the streamed audio from Bluetooth devices.

===== Controls =====
====== Head gestures ======
The head gestures give the user hands-free control of The Dash. For instance, when connected to a phone, the user can accept or reject calls by nodding or shaking his head, respectively. Using head gestures, the user can also navigate the menus on both sides of the Dash such as the training coach menu on left side. In this scenario, after a short hold on The left Dash, the user enters the training coach menu. The user can go through the activity list, which is composed of running, swimming and cycling, by head shakes and choose the activity to start by a head nod. Starting from Bragi OS 2.2, the user is given the ability to shake head to skip a track during the first 10 seconds of playtime. It is supported only when playing audio from the internal player.

====== Touch controls ======
The user can configure The Dash from the Bragi smartphone app such that the audio transparency is turned off automatically when the music is played or resumed, and turned on when the music is paused.

====== Shortcut ======
Previously called MyTap, the Shortcut feature of the Bragi OS recognizes a double tap gesture on user's cheek and triggers user-defined actions. Using the Bragi App, the user can choose between Google Now or Apple Siri activation, skipping an already playing song or playing/pausing a song as the triggered event. It is a feature under development and is included in Bragi OS version 2.2 as beta feature.

====== Routines ======
Bragi OS brings the Routines feature, where the user can configure The Dash to tell the time when the user inserts it and/or at full hours.

===== Touch lock =====
The user can deactivate the touch interface of The Dash to prevent unintended interaction with the device. This is done by a short hold on both left and right Dash at the same time. While Touch Lock is activated, no interaction with the touch interface is possible. To activate the touch interface, the user needs to remove the left Dash and insert into ear again.

===== WindShield =====
WindShield is another audio transparency feature of Bragi OS that was introduced with version OS 2.2. When enabled, it reduces the sound of breeze under windy conditions, while still letting the user hear the surroundings.

==== Release history ====
| Version | Release date | Release information |
|---|---|---|
| Bragi OS 1.3 | February 18, 2016 | Internal and external audio player; Improved quality from EarBone Microphone and the ambient microphones; Internal audio player supports all non-DRM MP3 and AAC formats; Head gestures can be used to accept and reject incoming calls; Full Bluetooth headset functionality; Control external media player over Bluetooth Audio Video Remote Control Profile (AVRCP); Improvements to heart rate calculation under movement; General OS bug fixes |
| Bragi OS 1.4 | April 8, 2016 | Improved speech quality in calls; Improved stability of system; Improved sensor precision; Improved robustness of EarTouch; General OS bug fixes |
| Bragi OS 1.5 | May 9, 2016 | Improved touch algorithms; Bug fixes for left and right sync issues (left Dash sometimes skipping); Charger power drain fix; App and Dash communication improvements. |
| Bragi OS 2.0 | July 12, 2016 | Calibration feature which enables The Dash to understand how it is aligned and placed in the ear; Secure pairing process for Bluetooth; Increased Sound Output and Sonic Precision; Improvements in voice quality during telephony, in challenging windy and noisy conditions |
| Bragi OS 2.1 | September 5, 2016 | Four new languages – Chinese, French, German and Spanish; Ability to synchronize with Google Fit and the Apple Health Kit.; Touch Lock, which prevents inadvertent gestures from impacting The Dash; Shuffle for the internal music player; On-demand heart rate tracking. |
| Bragi OS 2.2 | November 21, 2016 | Apple Watch Connectivity; MyTap BETA (Now called Shortcut); WindShield; MyControls; Versant 1.1; Heartrate Monitor Improvements |
| Bragi OS 3.0 | May 16, 2017 | Virtual 4D Menu; Shortcut (was MyTap BETA); AI powered activity tracking; Offline storage for activities; One touch BT setup; Versant 2.0; Super Hearing - Improved audio transparency; Improved audio quality and performance |
Legend: Unsupported Latest version Preview version Future version

== Criticism ==
According to the production timeline presented during the Kickstarter campaign, The Dash was supposed to be in full-scale production by November 2014. However, the product experienced delay for months because of various challenges in production. Initially, Bragi's plan was to connect the two sides of the Dash via Bluetooth. However, it turned out to be a very challenging task. As a result, the company made use of the NMFI technology to more reliable connection between the earphones. Finally, Bragi introduced The Dash in late 2015.

Another criticism of The Dash is the Bluetooth connectivity issues that some customers experienced. Bragi was able address some of these customer complaints with software updates. Bragi OS 2.2 was reported to have better connectivity than previous versions.

The Headphone, Bragi's second product, also suffered from delays due to manufacturing issues. The company started shipping the product in December 2016, one month after the initial target. The Headphone also received criticism for not including a battery in its charging case, which precluded charging while on the go
