= Éric Carreel =

Business person

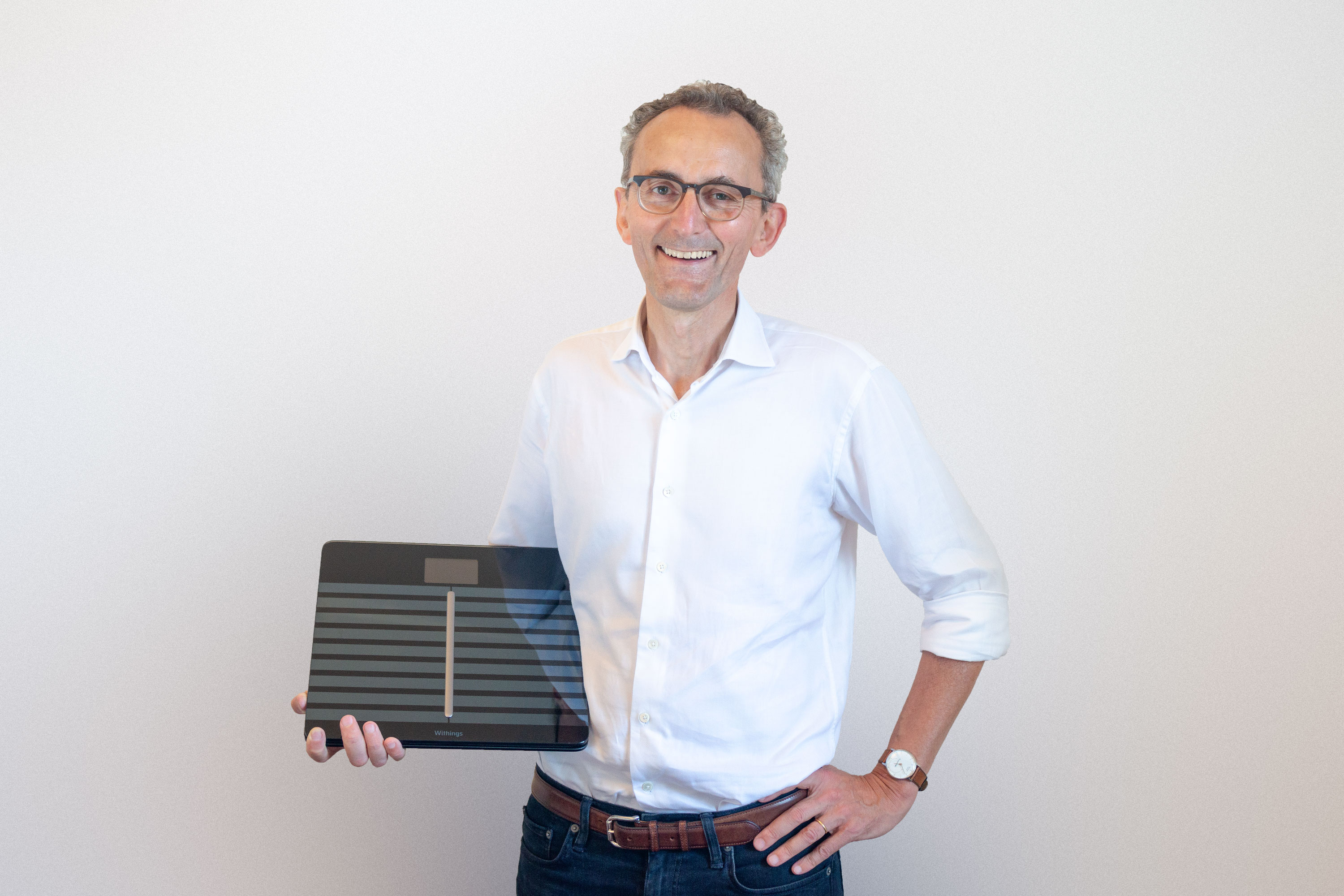
Eric Carreel cofounder & chairman of Withings, Sculpteo, invoxia and Zoov

Éric Carreel (born 28 June 1959 in Amiens), is a French engineer and serial entrepreneur. He is the founding president of Withings, Sculpteo, Invoxia and Zoov. He is a graduate of ESPCI ParisTech, holds a PhD in engineering from the Pierre and Marie Curie University, and has authored over 50 patents.

== Biography ==
Graduate engineer from ESPCI ParisTech (École supérieure de physique et de chimie industrielles de la ville de Paris, class of '84), Carreel began his career in institutional research as a radio scientist. In 1990, in collaboration with Prof. Jacques Lewiner, he founded Inventel. He presided over the company from 2002 to 2005, becoming one of Europe's foremost businesspeople in the field of triple play. Inventel created the Livebox for France Telecom. After the takeover of Inventel by Thomson SA in 2005, he became technical director of Thomson's household products division, where he created and managed the Advanced Product Development group.

In June 2008, with Frédéric Potter and Cédric Hutchings, he founded Withings, a manufacturer of communicating objects for health and wellness, such as the WIFI Body Scale, which was launched in 2009. In April 2016, the company is acquired by Finish company Nokia and rebranded Nokia Digital Health. In May 2018, Nokia announces that it has closed the sale of its digital health division, along with 200 employees, to Eric Carreel. Eric Carreel announces he relaunch the business under the Withings brand by the end of 2018, with a focus on preventive health.

In June 2009, joined by Clément Moreau, he founded Sculpteo, the online 3D printing platform which commercializes its service to both consumers and professionals, and which manufactures objects coming from 3D files. Then, in June 2012, he founded Invoxia with Serge Renouard. Invoxia is a manufacturer of IP telephones. The first Invoxia device was unveiled at IFA in Berlin in September 2011, branded shortly after as the Smart Office Phone. He also founded Zoov, a new ebike sharing service that wants to reinstate the bike station, in September 2017.

== Commitment ==
In July 2012, Éric Carreel becomes vice-president of France Digitale. France Digitale is an association which aims to bring together entrepreneurs and venture capitalists and to promote the digital economy among public authorities.

In September 2013, he is appointed head of the Connected Objects plan established by the French Ministry for Economic Regeneration (Ministère du Redressement Productif).

In September 2014, he is appointed member of the board of INPI as the industry environment representative, for industry interested by industrial property protection.

Éric Carreel is member of the International Scientific Council created in 2007 by ESPCI Paris.

He is also member of the FCS (Scientific Research Foundation) Board of Directors at the PSL Research University. The FCS Board of Directors is the principal decision-making body of FCS. It determines overall policy at PSL and conducts oversight to ensure implementation of its decisions.

Éric Carreel is member of the scientific council of EDF (Electricity of France) presided by Sébastien Candel.

In 2017, he joins French Academy of Technologies.

== Awards ==
In December 2011, Carreel receives the 2011 Engineer of the Year Award For An Entrepreneur from the National Council of Engineers and Scientists of France and L'Usine Nouvelle magazine.

In April 2012, he receives the 2012 Digital Technology Innovator Award from Télécom ParisTech.

In Novembre 2013, Éric Carreel wins the Revelation of the Year Trophy at the BFM Awards.

In December 2015, Éric Carreel is named chevalier (Knight) by the Legion of Honor, the highest French order of merit for military and civil merits.
