= Claire Prada =

French acoustical engineer

Claire Prada (born 1962) is a French applied mathematician and an expert on time-reversed acoustics. This is a technique in which an acoustic signal is recorded by a sensor array, and then re-broadcast from the sensors with its timing reversed from when it was received, in order to re-focus the signal at its original location. Beyond time reversal, her research interests include ultrasound imaging, guided elastic waves, laser ultrasonics, and applications including medical imaging and non-destructive testing. She is a director of research for the French National Centre for Scientific Research (CNRS), affiliated with the Institut Langevin, a joint research unit between ESPCI Paris and CNRS.

== Education and career ==
Prada was born in 1962 in Paris. After study in mathematics at the École Normale Supérieure and Pierre and Marie Curie University, she received a master's degree in 1987; she completed her Ph.D. through Paris Diderot University in 1991. Her doctoral dissertation, Retournement temporel des ondes ultrasonores : application à la focalisation, was directed by Mathias Fink.

She has been affiliated with CNRS since 1990.

== Recognition ==
Prada was elected as a Fellow of the Acoustical Society of America in 2006, "for contributions to time-reversal acoustic remote sensing".

She was one of two 2023 recipients of the Médaille Française of the French Acoustical Society.
