= Greenly (company) =

Carbon accounting software developer

- Company type: Private
- Industry: Carbon accounting
- Founded: 2019
- Founders: Alexis Normand; Arnaud Delubac; Matthieu Vegreville
- Headquarters: Paris, France
- Area served: Europe, United States
- Key people: Alexis Normand (CEO)
- Products: Carbon accounting SaaS platform
- Services: Greenhouse gas accounting, Life-cycle assessment, Environmental Product Declaration
- Number of employees: 250 (2025)
- Website: greenly.earth

Greenly is a Paris-based climate technology company that develops carbon accounting software.

== History ==
Greenly was founded in 2019 by Alexis Normand, Arnaud Delubac, and Matthieu Vegreville. It initially developed a mobile application for individuals to track their personal carbon footprints by linking to their bank accounts. By late 2020, Greenly had over one hundred thousand users for its consumer application.

In 2020, Greenly expanded its offerings to the business-to-business market, introducing a banking API deployed within BNPP’s own application, and later an enterprise platform for corporate carbon footprint monitoring. That year, Greenly was named FinTech of the Year in France and joined the CentraleSupélec accelerator program.

In April 2022, Greenly received €21 million in a Series A funding round co-led by XAnge and Energy Impact Partner. The funding supported Greenly’s expansion in Europe and the United States, including the opening of a New York office. By 2023, Greenly reported to have a turnover above $10 million.

In March 2024, Greenly raised $52 million in a Series B funding round led by Fidelity International Strategic Ventures, bringing its total funding to approximately $75 million with participation from multiple investors including Brian Halligan, co-founder and chairman of HubSpot, Hewlett Packard Enterprise, and HSBC.

In 2025, Greenly was named among the 100 fastest-growing startups in France & Southern Europe by Sifted.

== Platform ==
Greenly is a software-as-a-service (SaaS) carbon accounting platform serving businesses. It is used to automate the measurement, reporting, and reduction of greenhouse gas emissions across Scope 1, 2, and 3 categories.

Greenly aggregates data from sources such as financial transactions, utility bills, cloud computing usage, and supply-chain activities to calculate an organization's carbon footprint. Its interface includes data dashboards, analytics for identifying primary emission sources, and tools for modeling decarbonization. The system supports compliance with reporting standards such as the Greenhouse Gas (GHG) Protocol and the EU's Corporate Sustainability Reporting Directive (CSRD).

In 2024, Greenly expanded its services to include Life Cycle Assessment (LCA) and Environmental Product Declaration (EPD) reporting on its platform.

== Research ==
Greenly also publishes research reports on carbon emissions. An analysis of the 2022 FIFA World Cup concluded that the tournament generated approximately 6 million tonnes of CO₂e, an amount nearly double FIFA’s official estimate of 3.6 million tonnes, questioning the organizers' carbon neutrality claims.

A study published in late 2024 estimated that the social media platform TikTok generated a global footprint of approximately 50 million tonnes of CO₂e annually.
