= Isabelle Guyon =

French-born researcher in machine learning (born 1961)

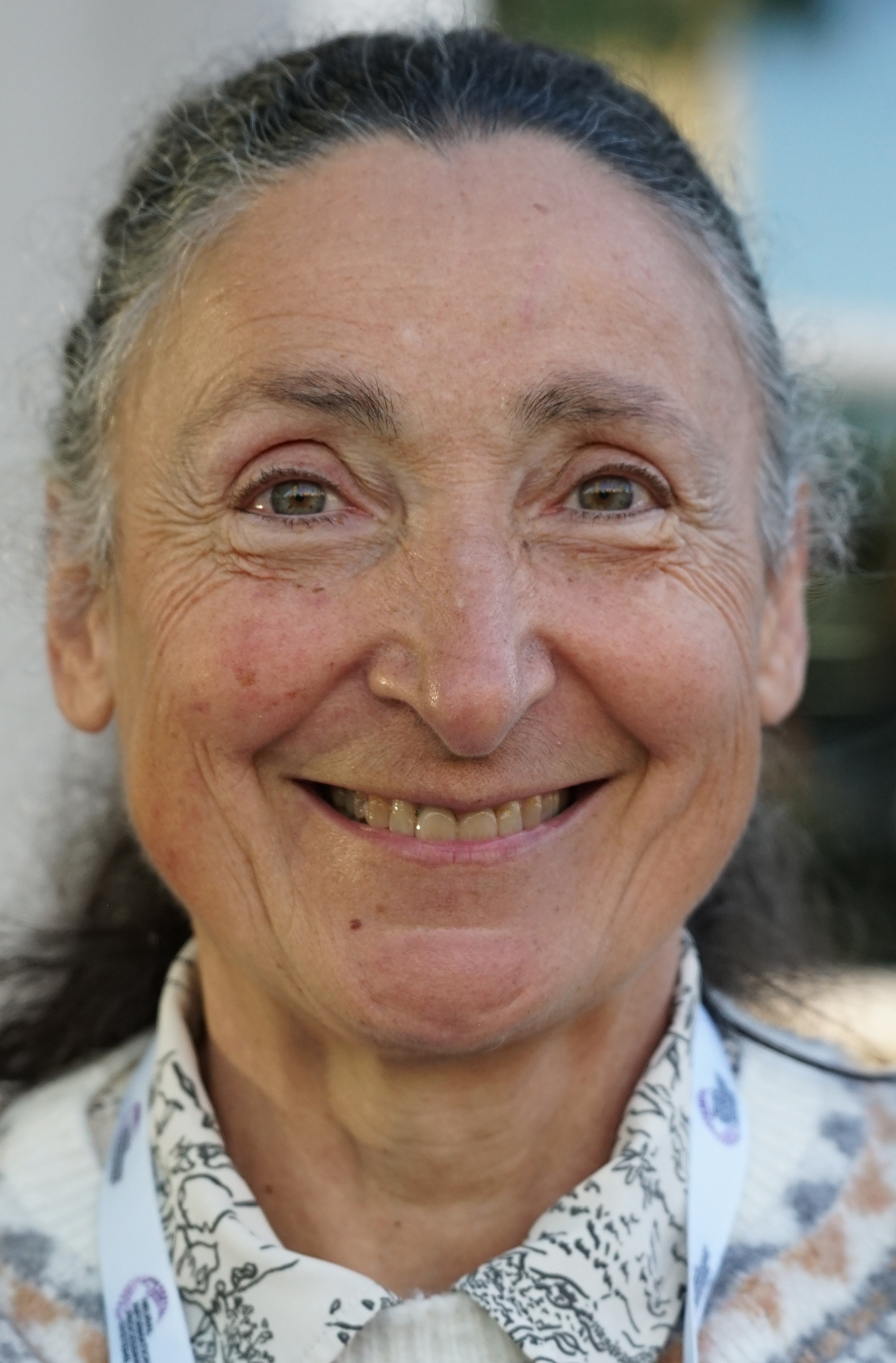
- Guyon in 2025
- Pronunciation: French pronunciation: [izabɛl ɡɥijɔ̃]
- Born: 15 August 1961; Paris, France
- Citizenship: French; Swiss; American
- Education: ESPCI Paris (MSc); Pierre and Marie Curie University (PhD)
- Known for: Support Vector Machines; Siamese neural network
- Awards: Chevalier de la Légion d'Honneur (2026); BBVA Foundation Frontiers of Knowledge Awards (2020); AMIA Fellow (2011)
- Scientific career
- Fields: Machine Learning
- Workplaces: Bell Labs; University of Paris-Saclay
- Thesis: Réseaux de neurones pour la reconnaissance des formes : architectures et apprentissage (neural networks for pattern recognition) (1988)
- Doctoral advisor: Gerard Dreyfus
- Website: guyon.chalearn.org

Isabelle Guyon (French pronunciation: [izabɛl ɡɥijɔ̃]; born August 15, 1961) is a French-born researcher in machine learning known for her work on support-vector machines, artificial neural networks and bioinformatics. She is a Chair Professor at the University of Paris-Saclay. Guyon serves as the Director of Research at Google DeepMind since October 2022.

She is considered to be a pioneer in the field, with her contribution to the support-vector machines with Vladimir Vapnik and Bernhard Boser.

== Biography ==
After graduating from the French engineering school ESPCI Paris in 1985, she joined the group of Gerard Dreyfus at the Université Pierre-et-Marie-Curie to do a PhD on neural networks architectures and training.

Guyon defended her thesis in 1988 and was hired the year after at AT&T Bell Laboratories, first as a post-doc, then as a group leader. She worked at Bell Labs for six years, where she explored several research areas, from neural networks to pattern recognition and computational learning theory, with application to handwriting recognition. She collaborated with Yann LeCun, Léon Bottou, Vladimir Vapnik, Corinna Cortes, Yoshua Bengio, Patrice Simard, and met her future husband, Bernhard Boser.

In 1996, Guyon left Bell Labs and raised her children at Berkeley, California. In Berkeley, she created her own machine learning consulting company, Clopinet. She became interested in medical applications, and used her previous work to classify the genes responsible for different types of cancers.

Since 2003, Guyon has organized many challenges in data science, in order to stimulate research in this field. She founded ChaLearn in 2011, a non-profit organization aimed at creating machine learning challenges open to everyone. She was Program Chair of NeurIPS 2016 and became General Chair of NeurIPS in 2017. She is also Action Editor for the Journal of Machine Learning Research and Series Editor for Series: Challenges in Machine Learning. She is a member of the European Laboratory for Learning and Intelligent Systems.

In 2016, Guyon came back to France to take the Chair Professorship in Big data between the University of Paris-Saclay and INRIA. She works in TAU (TAckling the Underspecified), a research collaboration of the Laboratoire de recherche en informatique.

Together with Bernhard Schölkopf and Vladimir Vapnik, she received in 2020 the BBVA Foundation Frontiers of Knowledge Awards for her work in machine learning.

== Scientific work ==
Guyon has worked in many subfields of machine learning, including neural networks, support-vector machines, feature selection and applications of machine learning to biology.

=== Support-vector machines ===
Among her most notable contributions, Guyon co-invented support-vector machines (SVM) in 1992, with Bernhard Boser and Vladimir Vapnik. SVM is a supervised machine learning algorithm, comparable to neural networks or decision trees, which has quickly become a classical technique in machine learning. SVMs have especially contributed to the popularization of kernel methods.

=== Neural networks ===
During her years at Bell Labs, Guyon took part of numerous projects involving neural networks. In particular, she wrote some of the first papers on the use of neural network for handwriting recognition using the MNIST database. She is also a co-inventor of the siamese neural networks, a neural network architecture used to learn similarities, with applications to signature, face or object recognition.

=== Machine learning for biology ===
Guyon is the author of many publications at the intersection of biology (cancer research and genomics) and artificial intelligence. She has notably introduced the use of support-vector machines to detect cancer using genes.

=== Machine learning challenges ===
Through her non-profit organization ChaLearn, Guyon has organized and directed challenges open to everyone in order to solve open problems in machine learning, including computer vision, neurosciences, particle physics, feature selection, causality and automated machine learning. Most of the challenges organized by ChaLearn have resulted in publications. Among the most cited ones are:

- Guyon et al., Result analysis of the NIPS 2003 feature selection challenge, Advances in neural information processing systems, 2005, link
- Escalera et al., ChaLearn Looking at People Challenge 2014: Dataset and Results, Computer Vision - ECCV 2014 Workshops, Springer International Publishing, 2014, link
- Guyon et al., A brief Review of the ChaLearn AutoML Challenge, JMLR: Workshop and Conference Proceedings 64:21-30, 2016, link
- Adam-Bourdario et al., The Higgs boson machine learning challenge, JMLR: Workshop and Conference Proceedings 42:19-55, 2015, link

== Private life ==
She is married to Bernhard Boser, a professor at UC Berkeley. She has twins and one daughter, all three of whom have completed a science degree. Guyon has three citizenships: French by birth, Swiss by marriage and American by naturalization.

== Awards and honors ==
- Nomination at the French Academy of technologies (2024)
- Recipient of the BBVA Foundation Frontiers of Knowledge Awards (2020)
- American Medical Informatics Association Fellow (2011)

== Publications ==
- Bernhard Boser, Isabelle Guyon and Vladmir Vapnik, A training algorithm for optimal margin classifiers, Proceedings of the fifth annual workshop on Computational learning theory, 1992, doi:10.1145/130385.130401
- Jane Bromley, Isabelle Guyon, Yann LeCun, Eduard Säckinger and Roopak Shah, Signature verification using a" siamese" time delay neural network, Advances in Neural Information Processing Systems, 1994.
- Isabelle Guyon and André Elisseeff, An introduction to variable and feature selection, Journal of Machine Learning Research, 2003.
- Isabelle Guyon, Jason Weston, Stephen Barnhill and Vladimir Vapnik, Gene selection for cancer classification using support vector machines, Machine Learning, Kluwer Academic Publishers, 2002, doi:10.1023/A:1012487302797

== See also ==
- Support Vector Machines
- Machine learning
- Deep learning
- Artificial neural networks
