= Alexis Normand =

French entrepreneur, co-founder of Greenly

Alexis Normand is a French entrepreneur, author, and climate-tech executive. He is the co-founder and chief executive officer of Greenly, a Paris-based software company providing automated carbon-accounting and ESG reporting tools. Normand previously worked at Withings and helped co-found the health-data startup Embleema. He is also the author of Prévenir plutôt que guérir : la révolution de la e-santé (Eyrolles, 2017).

== Early life and education ==
Normand was born in France to Nicolas Normand, a French diplomat and former ambassador, and Dominique Normand, an environmental lawyer. He studied business at HEC Paris, political science at Sciences Po, and philosophy at the Sorbonne. After considering a career in public administration, he began in strategy and policy consulting in the Gulf and Egypt, working on urban-planning and demographic projects.

== Career ==
=== Digital health ===
In 2011, Normand joined Withings, where he created the digital-health division and developed partnerships linking connected devices with healthcare providers.

In 2017, he published Prévenir plutôt que guérir : la révolution de la e-santé (Eyrolles), which advocates for predictive, preventive, participative, and personalized medicine while warning against the risks of surveillance and data misuse.

=== Greenly ===
In 2019, Normand co-founded Greenly with Matthieu Vegreville and Arnaud Delubac. Greenly provides a business-to-business (B2B) software platform for organizations to manage greenhouse-gas accounting. Greenly raised 21 million euros in a Series A round in 2022 and 49 million euros in a Series B round in 2024 led by Fidelity International Strategic Ventures, with participation from Benhamou Global Ventures, Move Capital, HSBC, XAnge, and Energy Impact Partners. He is chief executive officer of Greenly.
