= Invoxia =

French consumer electronics company

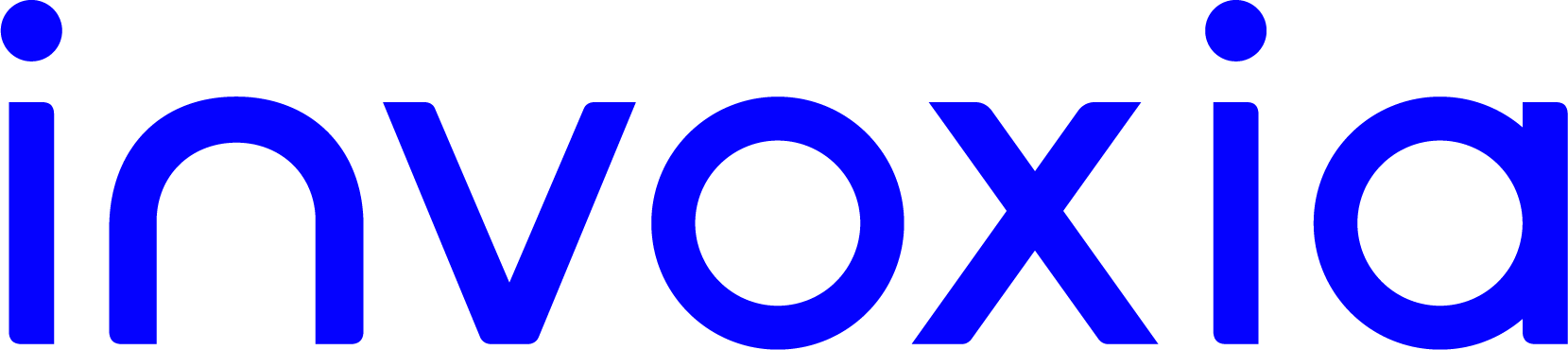
- Type: Private
- Industry: Consumer electronics
- Founded: 2010; 16 years ago
- Founder: Eric Carreel | Serge Renouard
- Headquarters: Issy les Moulineaux, France.
- Key people: Éric Carreel (Président); Amélie Caudron (CEO)
- Products: Speakers, Phones, audio equipment, Professional audio, Wearable technology, Pet accessories,
- Number of employees: 50 (2021)
- Website: invoxia.com

Invoxia is a French consumer electronics company known for the design and development of innovative smart devices that use artificial intelligence, such as the first GPS tracker on the market to use LoRa technology (introduced in 2017), the first connected speaker outside the Amazon ecosystem to use the Alexa voice system and a line of GPS trackers for preventing bike theft and monitoring pet activity. For the B2B market, it provides fleet tracking and asset management services. It also provides industrial IoT services including hardware design and development and the training and integration of neural networks.

Invoxia was founded in 2010 by the French serial entrepreneur Éric Careel (also Withings, Sculpteo and Zoov) and Serge Renouard.

Invoxia is backed by Newfund since 2012. In 2013, Invoxia took control of the ancestral telephone manufacturer Swissvoice.

In October 2015, Amazon announced Invoxia as a recipient of the Alexa Fund to integrate Alexa voice services into Triby.

== Products ==
- NVX 610: a smart desktop and conference IP phone
- NVX 620 a smart desktop and conference IP phone
- NVX 220 a smart desktop IP phone
- AudiOffice a smart desktop and conference dock
- VoiceBridge: a device to merge landline and mobile
- Triby
- Triby IO
- GPS Tracker a multipurpose GPS tracking unit operating on SIGFOX and LoRaWAN networks
- Bike Tracker a GPS tracking unit designed for locating bicycles
- LongFi GPS Tracker that operates on the decentralized Helium Network
- Smart Dog Collar a biometric monitoring collar for dogs, with heart and respiratory rate measurement capability

== Awards ==
- Invoxia was awarded the CES Best Innovation Award 2012 for its Smart Office Phone at the Consumer Electronic Show in Las Vegas.
- Invoxia won the 2012 Red Dot Design Award for the NVX 610 VoIP Phone.
- Invoxia was awarded two CES Innovation Awards in 2016 in the categories "Portable Media Players and Accessories" and "Wireless Handsets."
- Invoxia was awarded the CES Innovation Award in 2019 in the "Wearable" category for its Pet Tracker.
- Invoxia was awarded the CES 2020 Innovation Award for its Bike Tracker.
- Invoxia was awarded two CES Innovation Awards in 2022 in the categories "Wearable Technologies" and "Health and Wellness" for its Smart Dog Collar.
