= ESPCI Paris =

Institution of higher education

Coordinates: 48°50′29″N 2°20′49″E

ESPCI Paris – PSL
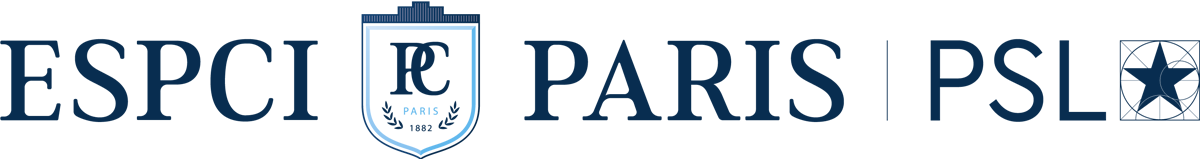
- Type: Public Grande École
- Established: 1882
- Affiliations: ParisTech; IDEA League; ASTech
- Academic affiliations: PSL Research University
- Location: Paris, France
- Campus: 5th arrondissement of Paris
- Website: ESPCI Paris

ESPCI Paris (officially the École supérieure de physique et de chimie industrielles de la ville de Paris, pronounced [ekɔl sypeʁjœʁ də fizik e də ʃimi ɛ̃dystʁijɛl də la vil də paʁi], "The City of Paris Industrial Physics and Chemistry Higher Educational Institution") is a grande école founded in 1882 by the city of Paris, France. It educates undergraduate and graduate students in physics, chemistry and biology and conducts high-level research in those fields. It is ranked as the first French École d'Ingénieurs in the 2017 Shanghai Ranking.

ESPCI Paris is a constituent college of Université PSL and a founding member of the ParisTech (Paris Institute of Technology) alliance.

Two thirds of the students enter the school following a competitive examination (concours X-ESPCI-ENS) following at least two years of Classes Préparatoires. The other students are recruited by submitting applications. The school itself is also known as Physique-Chimie or simply PC.

ESPCI Paris nurtures relationships with many industrial partners such as Schlumberger, Rhodia, TotalEnergies, Thales, Arkema, Michelin, Withings, which sponsors groups of students and has research contracts with ESPCI laboratories. ESPCI Paris also has partnerships with L'Oréal and Saint-Gobain for professional recruitment.

== History ==
At the end of the 19th century, following the annexation of Alsace and Lorraine by Germany, France lost the École de Chimie de Mulhouse (Mulhouse Chemistry School), which was at that time the best chemistry school in the country. One of its professors, Charles Lauth, obtained permission from the government in 1878 to create a Grande École. In 1882 the École Supérieure de Chimie Industrielles de la Ville de Paris was established and became ESPCI, its current name, in 1948. Since its foundation, the founders of the school have emphasized pluridisciplinarity. Biology was introduced in 1994. There are no tuition fees at ESPCI.

After its establishment, the school rapidly became a meeting spot for the best scientists. From 1880 on, Pierre and Jacques Curie started a serie of research on crystal electrical properties that led to the piezoelectricity discovery. In 1897, Marie Curie started her work on uranic rays discovered by Becquerel one year earlier. After numerous experiments in the ESPCI laboratories, she discovered that pitchblende was 4 times more radioactive than uranium or thorium. In July 1898, the Curies announced the discovery of polonium and in December of the same year that of radium. Pierre and Marie Curie received the Physics Nobel Prize in 1903. After the death of her husband, Marie Curie was granted the Chemistry Nobel Prize in 1911.

Many former students have distinguished themselves, amongst which are Georges Claude (5th year), founder of Air Liquide, Paul Langevin (7th year), physicist and inventor and Frédéric Joliot-Curie (39th year), founder of the CEA and Nobel Prize in Chemistry in 1935 with his wife Irène Joliot-Curie.

In 1976, Pierre-Gilles de Gennes (Nobel Prize 1991) became Director of the school and remained in this position until his retirement in 2002.

In 2015, the city of Paris announced a major renovation plan, in order to modernize the buildings and laboratories of the school. Renovation work should start in 2018 and last five years.

== Education ==
The course of study lasts four years. The two first years give the students a strong basic education in physics, chemistry and biology. The students can major in physics, chemistry or physico-chemistry. Laboratory research projects are also carried out. During the third year, the students carry out an industrial internship, which lasts from 4 to 6 months. More than 50% of the students do their internship abroad, in European countries, the United-States, Japan, China, Australia, or other countries. During the fourth year, the students can either begin doctoral studies or do a masters abroad or in France. In 2002 a masters program in bioengineering was created.

The quality of the education at ESPCI enables its students to work in any industrial sector (telecommunication, computing, chemistry, pharmacology, biology, and other fields), mostly in Research and Development (47% in R&D, 10% in production, 10% in consultancy, 5% in environmental work, 3% in teaching, 3% in computing, 22% in other fields such as marketing or management).

== Admission ==
The primary mode of admission (60 out of 90 students every year) is a competitive examination open to candidates enrolled in the PC (Physics-Chemistry) section of the Preparatory Classes to the Grandes écoles. The examinations are the same as for the Ecole Polytechnique but the components are weighted differently.

Candidates to the competitive examination must have their licence or an equivalent diploma. They must be aged between 17 and 22 on 1 January of the examination year. Foreign candidates must be under 26 and can attempt this examination three times.

It is also possible for students from the MP section (Maths-Physics), PSI section (Physics and Engineering Sciences), and BCPST section (Biology, Chemistry, Physics and Earth Sciences) of the preparatory classes or having completed 2 or 3 years of physics or chemistry in a French university to apply for ESPCI Paris. Admission is reserved to first class honours students selected according to their academic results.

== Directors of the ESPCI ==
- Paul Schützenberger (1882–1896), member of the French Academy of Sciences
- Charles Lauth (1897–1904)
- Albin Haller (1905–1924), member of the French Academy of Sciences
- Paul Langevin (1925–1946), member of the French Academy of Sciences
- René Lucas (1947–1968), member of the French Academy of Sciences
- Georges Champetier (1969–1975), member of the French Academy of Sciences
- Pierre-Gilles de Gennes (1976–2003), Nobel laureate, member of the French Academy of Sciences
- Jacques Prost (2003–2013), member of the French Academy of Sciences
- Jean-François Joanny (2013–2019)
- Vincent Croquette (2019-2026)
- Emanuelle Gouillart since 2026

== Notable faculty ==
- Jérôme Bibette, physical chemist, founder of five startups RainDance Technologies, Ademtech, Capsum, HiFiBio and Calyxia.
- Bernard Cabane, member of the French Academy of Sciences
- Georges Charpak, Nobel laureate
- Janine Cossy, professor of organic chemistry, Novartis Prize (2000), Boehringer Ingelheim Prize (2001)
- Mathias Fink, professor of acoustics, professor at the Collège de France, member of the French Academy of Sciences, founder of Sensitive Object, SuperSonic Imagine, Echosens and Time Reversal Com.
- Étienne Guyon, former director of the École Normale Supérieure and the Palais de la Découverte
- Ludwik Leibler, professor of soft matter, member of the National Academy of Engineering
- Jacques Lewiner, professor of solid state physics, member of the French Academy of Technologies, founder of Inventel, Roowin, Cynove and Finsécur
- Pierre Papon, professor of thermal physics, former director general of the CNRS
- Jean Rossier, professor of biology, member of the French Academy of Sciences
- Jérôme Lesueur, professor of quantum physics
- Dimitri Roditchev, professor of condensed matter physics

== Notable alumni ==
- Paul Lebeau (4°), chemist, member of the French Academy of Sciences
- Lucien Lévy (1892–1965), French radio engineer and radio receiver manufacturer.
- Paul Boucherot (4°), physicist, pioneer of DC electric power distribution
- Georges Claude (5°), founder of Air Liquide
- Paul Langevin (7°), professor at the Collège de France, member of the French Academy of Sciences
- Georges Urbain (9°), chemist, discoverer of the element Lutetium, member of the French Academy of Sciences
- André-Louis Debierne (9°), chemist, discoverer of the element Actinium
- Fernand Holweck (26°), physicist
- René Lucas (34°), physicist, member of the French Academy of Sciences
- Henri Moureu (36°), chemist, member of the French Academy of Sciences
- Frédéric Joliot (39°), Nobel laureate (1935), founder of the CEA
- Jean-Jacques Trillat (39°), physicist, member of the French Academy of Sciences
- Georges Champetier (41°), chemist, member of the French Academy of Sciences
- Gaston Charlot (41°), chemist, member of the French Academy of Sciences
- Pierre Gy (62°), chemist and statistician
- Philippe Dreyfus (66°) informatics pioneer
- Michel Winterberger (67°), Pechiney scientific advisor, member of the French Academy of Technologies
- Michel Lavalou (69°), Rhône-Poulenc scientific advisor, member of the French Academy of Technologies
- Maurice Goldman (70°), physicist, member of the French Academy of Sciences
- Guy Sebban (83°), International Chamber of Commerce Secretary General
- Alain Brillet (85°), CNRS Gold Medal 2017, codirector of Virgo for 15 years.
- Henri-Dominique Petit (87°), Chairman of Sperian Protection
- Sylvain Visconti (87°), former vice-president of Rhone-Poulenc
- Serge Le Berre (87°), former CTO of Valeo.
- Michel Baritiu (87°), former vice-président of Halliburton
- Christian Dailly (87°), International director of Arkema
- Laurent Vigroux (89°), director of the Institut d'astrophysique de Paris
- Xavier Drago (90°), sustainable development director and member of the board of Air Liquide
- Bernard Serin (90°), chairman of Cockerill-Sambre (CMI) (ex-Usinor) and of the FC Metz
- Philippe Goebel (91°), chairman of Total Petrochemicals France
- Patrice Robichon (91°), scientific advisor of Pernod-Ricard
- Christian Reinaudo (92°), President of Agfa HealthCare
- Philippe Klein (95°), executive vice-president of Renault, member of the Volvo Board
- Hervé This (95°), physical chemist
- Henri Rajbenbach (98°), general director of the Information technology at the European Commission
- Éric Carreel (98°), co-founder of Withings, Sculpteo and Invoxia.
- Isabelle Guyon (100°), pioneer and researcher in machine learning.

== Laboratories ==
ESPCI hosts high levels laboratories:

- Langevin Institute of Prof. Arnaud Tourin
- Chemistry, Biology and Innovation Institute of Prof. Jerome Bibette
- Gulliver Laboratory of Prof.Elie Raphael
- Physics and Materials Laboratory of Prof. Ricardo Lobo
- Physics and Mechanics of Heterogeneous Media of Prof. Philippe Petitjeans
- Soft Matter and Chemistry Laboratory of Prof. Ludwik Leibler
- Brain Plasticity Unit of Prof. Thomas Preat
- Biological Mass Spectrometry and Proteomics of Prof. Joelle Vinh
- Sciences and Engineering of Soft Matter of Prof. Christian Fretigny

== The ESPCI Paris International Scientific Committee ==
President:

- Prof. Michael Cates, Lucasian Professor of Mathematics at the University of Cambridge

Members:

- Pr. Jian Ping Gong, Professor at the Laboratory of Soft & Wet Matter at Hokkaido University, Sapporo (Japan)
- Prof. Laura H. Greene, Physics professor at Florida State University, Chief Scientist at the National High Magnetic Field Laboratory, Professor of physics at the University of Illinois at Urbana-Champaign
- Prof. Hui Cao, Professor of Applied Physics and of Physics at Yale University
- Prof. Ben Feringa Professor of Molecular Sciences at University of Groningen
- Prof. Krzysztof Matyjaszewski, Professor of The Natural Sciences at Carnegie Mellon University
- Prof. Bruno Weber, Professor at the University of Zurich, Institute of Pharmacology & Toxicology – Experimental Imagining and Nauroenergetics
- Dr. Armand Adjari, Vice-president Research & Development of Saint-Gobain (France)
- Dr. Éric Carreel, President-founder of Inventel, Invoxia, Sculpteo & Withings
- Dr. Helen Routh, Global Healthcare Executive: Innovation, Technology Development, & General Management, Philips (Boston, USA)
