= Acoustic phase conjugation =

Acoustic phase conjugation is a set of techniques meant to perform phase conjugation on acoustic waves.

== Techniques ==
Diagram of a phonon-photon interaction

Acoustic phase conjugation can appear in a solid when the sound velocity is modulated by an electromagnetic field. The generation of the conjugate wave can be seen as the decay of a photon into two phonons, as seen on the diagram. The two phonons have opposite wave vectors k and -k (they will propagate in opposite directions) and a frequency two times smaller than that of the photon.

Parametric pumping techniques can be performed in several media:

- In piezoelectric crystals, a nonlinear piezoelectric effect will produce a modulation of fractions of a percent.
- In magnetic crystals, a modulation of dozens of percent can be reached through the magneto-acoustic coupling, which can be improved by combining the magnetostriction and spin reorientation transition effects or using the magnetoacoustic resonance. A "supercritical" or "giant" amplification, up to 80 dB, can be obtained beyond the threshold of instability of phonons in magnetoacoustic media.
- In semiconductors, parametric interaction between phonons and plasmon can be generated by an alternative electric field or a modulated optical pump.

== Applications ==
The auto-compensation of phase distortion and auto-focusing properties of the conjugate wave are used in non-destructive testing techniques. In medical therapy, they can be combined with giant amplification for tumor destruction, like lithotripsy and hyperthermia therapy.

Acoustic imaging can be improved by applying selective phase conjugation on some harmonics of the incident wave. This narrows the focal distribution of those harmonics and reduces the sidelobes and reverberation noise, thus increasing the image resolution.

Selective acoustic phase conjugation can be used to detect isoechogenic objects whose nonlinear parameters differ from that of the medium. The linear acoustic properties of such objects are close to that of the medium which make them invisible with traditional echography techniques.

Another field of application is nonlinear ultrasonic velocimetry, one order of magnitude more precise than with the usual Doppler effect. Phase conjugate velocimeters have proved to correctly measure the flow velocity in the case of laminar flows in tubes, vortex flows under rotating disks and immersed jets in water.

== See also ==
- Phase conjugation
- Optical phase conjugation
- Time Reversal Signal Processing
