= Christian Reinaudo =

French businessman (born 1954)

Christian Reinaudo (born 1954) is a French businessman. Since 1 January 2008, he is President of the Agfa HealthCare business group and a member of the Executive Committee of Agfa-Gevaert.

== Education ==
He graduated from the ESPCI Paris and obtained a doctorate (PhD) at the Pierre and Marie Curie University.

== Career ==
Christian Reinaudo started his career with Alcatel in 1978 at the research center at Marcoussis, France. In 1984, he joined Alcatel's Cable activities where he became responsible for research associated with fiber optics and cable for undersea applications. In 1997 he became President of Alcatel's Submarine Networks Division and responsible for all its manufacturing and purchasing activities. From 1999 to 2003 he was President of the Alcatel Optics Group, which comprises all activities in terrestrial and submarine transmission networking, optoelectronic components and is part of the Corporate Research Centre. In 2003, he was appointed President of Alcatel Asia Pacific. In his latest position at Alcatel, he was Area President Europe and North for Alcatel - Lucent and was responsible the integration and transition process after the merger of Alcatel with Lucent Technologies. Since 1 January 2008, he is President of the Agfa HealthCare business group and member of the Executive Committee of Agfa.

== Sources ==
- Agfa-Gevaert: C Reinaudo nommé président d'Agfa Healthcare (in French)
