= Kinsa =

Internet-connected thermometer company (founded 2012)

Kinsa Inc.

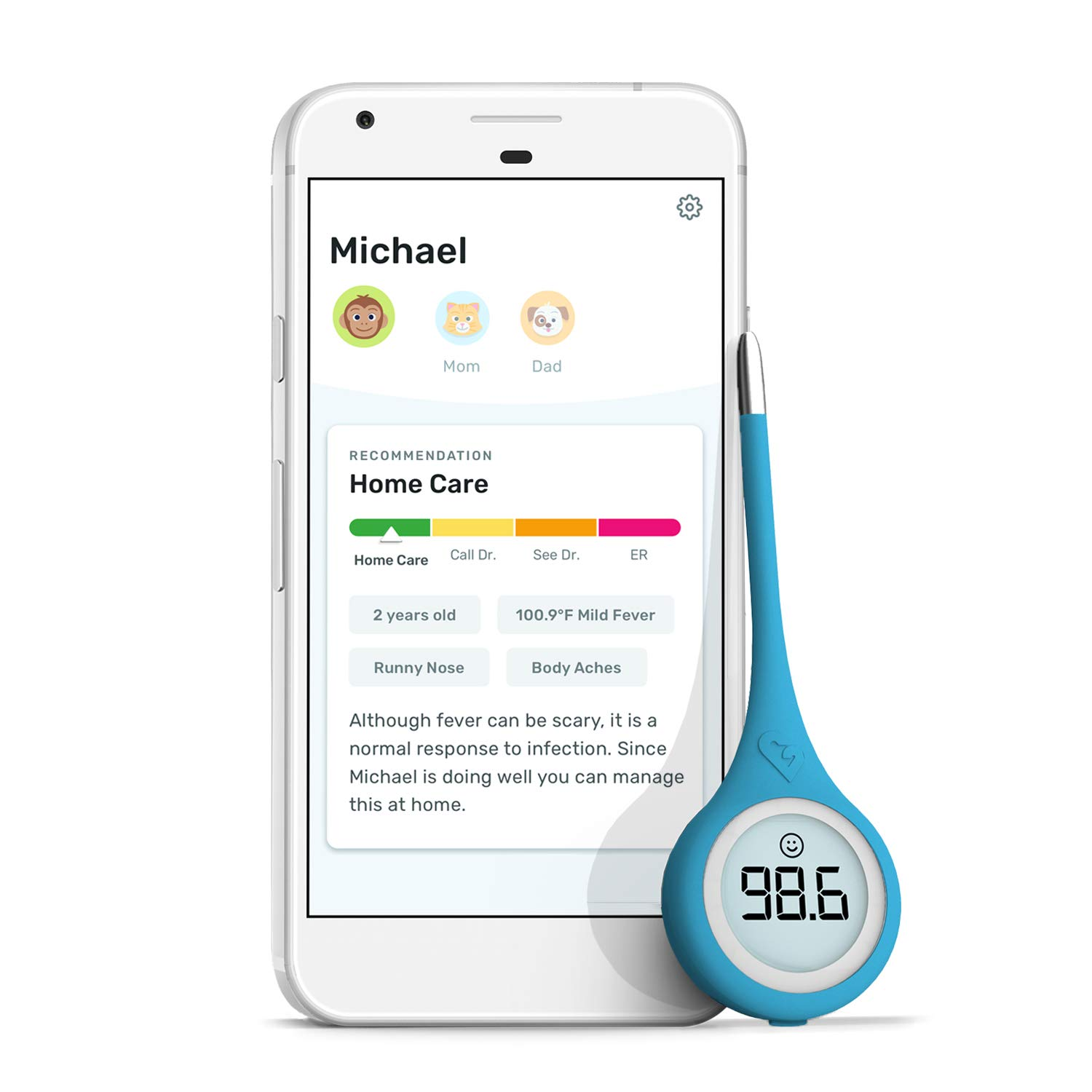
- The Kinsa Smart thermometer and mobile app
- Type: Private
- Founded: March 2012; 14 years ago
- Founder: Inder Singh
- Headquarters: San Francisco, California
- Website: kinsahealth.com

Kinsa Inc. is a health technology company with a platform that provides predictive insights for pharmaceutical companies, retailers, illness product companies, public health agencies, hospital systems, and communities. Kinsa aims to stop the spread of infectious illness through a network of smart thermometers that power their Insights platform.

== History ==
The company was founded by Inder Singh in March 2012.

In 2014, Kinsa raised $9.6 million, led by the venture firm Kleiner Perkins, to be used for developing and testing its first medical thermometer, a thermometer that uses smartphone-connected sensors.

Later in 2014, Kinsa received FDA 510(k) clearance for the smart thermometer. It began to be sold in Apple stores in December 2014. and was featured in an Apple commercial.

In 2015 Kinsa launched another product, a BLE smart ear thermometer, which syncs with the app via Bluetooth. It uses the same health tracker app.

In 2016, Kinsa launched its third product, a second smart ear thermometer, in partnership with Sesame Street Updates to the app for the new smart thermometer include the voice and image of Elmo who speaks to kids as they're taking their temperatures.

In March 2017, Kinsa closed a $17 Million Series B round of financing in March 2017, led by GSR Ventures.

In January 2018, Kinsa's QuickCare Thermometer launched to the public.

During 2020, Kinsa used its database of US temperature data to predict COVID-19 hot spots. Often before public health officials noticed them.

In January 2024, Kinsa was acquired by Healthy Together.

== Products and services ==
The Kinsa Insights AI platform is powered by over 3 million “smart” thermometers and is available for purchase through retailers such as CVS Pharmacy, Walgreens, Amazon (company), Best Buy, and more. Both the Kinsa QuickScan (non-contact thermometer) and Kinsa QuickCare (stick thermometer) devices link to their mobile app, providing users with accurate temperature readings, symptom tracking, and real-time health recommendations.

Kinsa studies the unique features of an illness and incorporates what's circulating nearby to offer personalized guidance from symptom onset through recovery. By analyzing geographic illness trends, Kinsa quickly identifies at-risk areas and mobilizes the organizations that can help stop the spread.

Kinsa's smart thermometer collects illness data which is analyzed and displayed by an app developed by the company. Users can track temperatures, symptoms, medication doses and diagnoses, as well as get real-time guidance on what to do if symptoms are cause for concern. The app also has a local groups feature for school communities with a health summary and message board. It tells members which illnesses are going around their school, such as the flu or strep throat.

Kinsa thermometers and apps track symptoms and health history, and offer personalized guidance, services and information about illnesses circulating nearby to help individuals get better faster. The company's line of smart thermometers include the first-ever FDA-cleared, app-enabled smart stick thermometer, a smart ear thermometer, a Sesame Street branded smart ear thermometer, and the Kinsa QuickCare thermometer (oral, underarm, rectal).

== Awards ==
- Cleveland Clinic Medical Innovation - Grand Prize
- Demo Mobile 2013 - Grand Prize
- New York City Innovate Health Tech - Grand Prize
