= Phase conjugation =

Physical transformation of a wave field

Phase conjugation is a physical transformation of a wave field where the resulting field has a reversed propagation direction but keeps its amplitudes and phases.

== Description ==
It is distinguished from Time Reversal Signal Processing by the fact that phase conjugation uses a holographic or parametric pumping whereas time reversal records and re-emits the signal using transducers.

- Holographic pumping makes the incident wave interact with a pump wave of the same frequency and records its amplitude-phase distribution. Then, a second pump wave reads the recorded signal and produces the conjugate wave. All those waves have the same frequency.
- In parametric pumping, the parameters of the medium are modulated by the pump wave at double frequency. The interaction of this perturbation with the incident wave will produce the conjugate wave.

Both techniques allow an amplification of the conjugate wave compared to the incident wave.

As in time reversal, the wave re-emitted by a phase conjugation mirror will auto-compensate the phase distortion and auto-focus itself on its initial source, which can be a moving object.

Propagation of a time reversal replica demonstrates a remarkable property of phase-conjugated wave fields. Phase conjugation of wave field means the inversion of linear momentum and angular momentum of light.

Phase conjugation methods exist in two main domains:

- Acoustic phase conjugation
- Optical phase conjugation

== See also ==
- Time Reversal Signal Processing
