= Bernard Cabane =

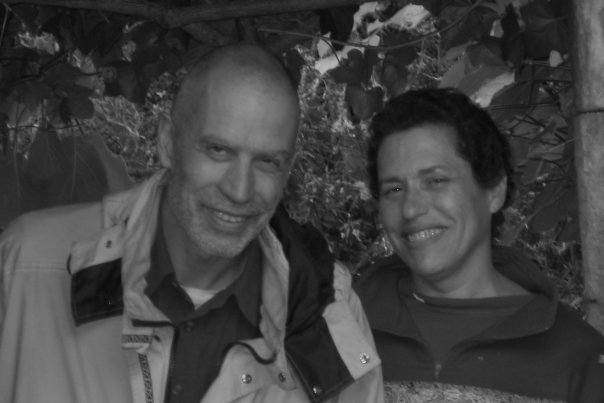
Bernard Cabane and Celie Fox Cabane

Bernard Cabane (born 12 October 1945) is a French mountaineer, scientist (physicist and chemist), director emeritus of the French National Center for Scientific Research (CNRS) in ESPCI ParisTech where he worked with Nobel Laureate Pierre Gilles De Gennes and corresponding member of the French Academy of Sciences. He was awarded the Silver Medal of the French National Center for Scientific Research. Expert in colloidal and surface science, wine tannins, polymers and surfactants, and fluid dynamics. In mountaineering, he is known for making the 7th ascent of Mt Salcantay in Peru.
