= Sculpteo =

French company specializing in 3D printing

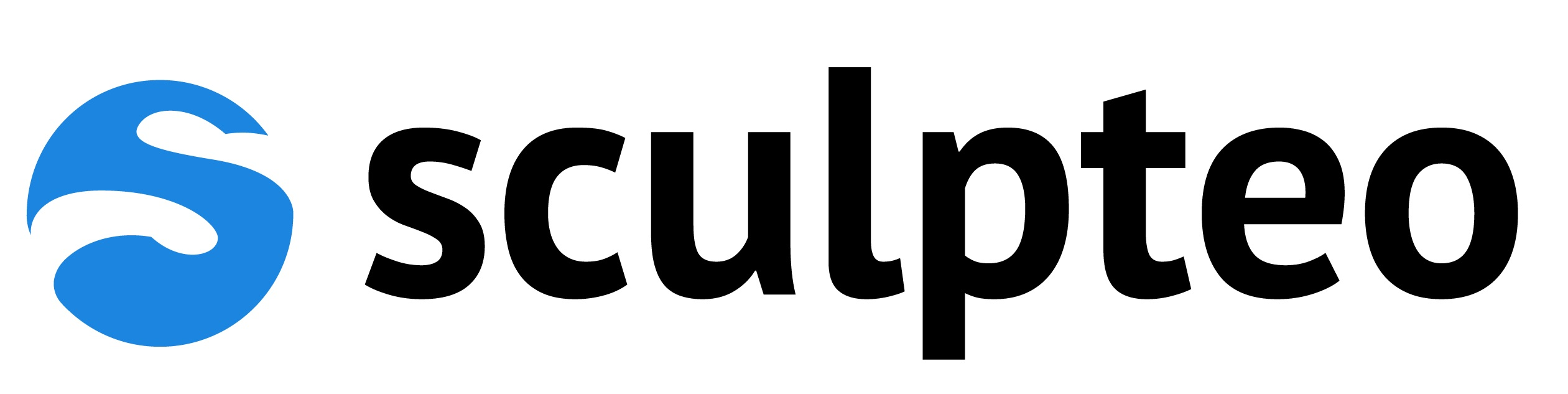
- Type: Private
- Industry: Online 3D printing service
- Founded: (2009)
- Founders: Eric Carreel; Clément Moreau; Jacques Lewiner
- Headquarters: Villejuif, France
- Website: www.sculpteo.com

Sculpteo is a French company specialized in 3D printing in the cloud. Sculpteo offers an online 3D printing service, for rapid prototyping and production using technologies such as laser sintering, stereo lithography, Multi Jet Fusion, FDM, Polyjet, DLS, DLP/LCD, SLM/DMLS or Binder Jetting. The company was founded in June 2009 by Eric Carreel (co-founder of Inventel, acquired by Technicolor in 2005, and Withings), Clement Moreau and Jacques Lewiner. Sculpteo offers online 3D printing services, particularly in Europe and North America The company was acquired in 2019 by the German multinational chemical company BASF.

== Purpose ==
The company markets an online 3D printing service and the manufacture of objects from 3D files for individuals, businesses and manufacturers. The customer can upload his 3D model to the site and get his quote automatically.

The parts are then manufactured in Sculpteo's ISO 9001-certified factories.

Sculpteo offers a rapid prototyping service, manufacturing on demand, or contract manufacturing, thanks to various manufacturing technologies such as: selective laser sintering, HP Multi Jet Fusion, stereolithography, FDM, etc. These prototyping and production services are aimed at all industries, including the drone, medical, electronics, robotics and luxury sectors.

The price depends on the order, the price is calculated according to the volume of material used, the size and the number of pieces.

== History and background ==
The company was created in June 2009. Two years after, in January 2011, Sculpteo launches their online 3D printing service for the general public by allowing users to make your own avatar from simple 2D photos modeled in 3D. In March 2011, the company launches Pro.Sculpteo, an online 3D printing service for professionals. In June 2011, Sculpteo and 3DVIA announce a direct printing service provided by Sculpteo via the 3Dvia portal.

In January 2012, Sculpteo launches the 3D printing Cloud Engine and the Sculpteo app at the Consumer Electronics Show in Las Vegas. The app transforms human data into a 3D printed object using an iOS device. In September 2012, Sculpteo launches 3DPCase, the first smartphone app able to generate the 3D file of an iPhone case directly from the smartphone. For the app, Sculpteo is granted the Prize of Best Innovator at CES 2013. This new approach of unit production highlights the flexibility of the online 3D manufacturing process and allows the company to commercialize iPhone 5 cases before the launch of the iPhone 5.

In December 2012, Sculpteo raises 2 million euros thanks to XAnge, branch of the French bank Banque Postale, business angels and founders.

In March 2013, Sculpteo commercializes Lighting plug connectors manufactured in 3D printing. Late 2013, La Poste launches a 3D printing service in post offices, in partnership with Sculpteo.

In January 2014, at the Las Vegas Consumer Electronics Show, Sculpteo unveils "3D Batch Control", a cloud 3D printing service designed for professionals and businesses in need of short-run manufacturing. It allows users to upload a 3D file, change the size and dimensions of the object directly within the browser, select a printing material and order their design to be 3D printed and shipped. In May 2014, Sculpteo seeks to reduce 3D printing costs and material squandering by optimizing the quantity of used material. In this light, the company launches a free service named "Hollowing". The same month, designers conceive innovative 3D objects that Amazon, in partnership with Sculpteo, proposes in a dedicated online store opened in July 2014. In June 2014, the company continues its pursuit in democratizing 3D technology and integrates its printing service in the Adobe Photoshop Creative Cloud thus rendering the process of 3D manufacture more simple. In November 2014, Sculpteo launches a free service named "Thickening" aimed to reinforce the robustness of fragile parts without having to use a modelling software.

In January 2015, at Consumer Electronics Show, Sculpteo reveals FinalProof, a tool that allows users to apprehend the final result of the object file before printing. In April of the same year, Sculpteo announces a 5 million euros fundraising thanks to Creadev, investment fund of Mulliez family, and Xange, well known investor. In November, the computer Sprout by HP integrates the 3D printing service of Sculpteo.

In January 2016, Sculpteo launches a new material for additive manufacturing that is more flexible than the others TPU. Several branches are targeted, such as medical branch and the fashion industry. In March, a partnership with Carbon allows Sculpteo to offer the 3D printing technology "CLIP".

In November 2019, Sculpteo was acquired by BASF. The international group said to have purchased the company to market new industrial 3D printing materials more quickly for its 3D printing subsidiary. In June 2022, Sculpteo announced Alexandre d’Orsetti as its new CEO.

== Awards ==
- In January 2013, at Consumer Electronics Show, Sculpteo received the Best of CES Innovations Award for 3DPCase, its new 3D printing mobile application 3DPcase.
- In 2012, Sculpteo was granted the "Observeur du Design" label by Observeur du Design thus being acknowledged as a reference in the world of design.
- In 2011, Eric Carreel received the Prize for Engineers 2011 awarded by the French National Council of Engineers and Scientists and the magazine Usine Nouvelle.

== See also ==
- 3D Printing Marketplace
- BASF
