= Matthieu Vegreville =

Matthieu Vegreville is a French engineer and businessman who co-founded the carbon accounting company Greenly.

== Early life and education ==
Vegreville was born in November 1991. He studied at École Polytechnique and Télécom Paris.

== Career ==
Before Greenly, Vegreville worked in data science at Withings, a connected-health company, and at Embleema, a health-data company.

In 2019, Vegreville co-founded Greenly in Paris with Alexis Normand and Arnaud Delubac. Greenly provides a business-to-business (B2B) software platform for organizations to manage greenhouse gas accounting. Greenly raised 21 million euros in a Series A round in 2022 and 49 million euros in a Series B round in 2024 led by Fidelity International Strategic Ventures, with participation from Benhamou Global Ventures, Move Capital, HPE, HSBC, XAnge, and Energy Impact Partners. Vegreville serves as chief operating officer of Greenly. He also serves as chief technology officer of Greenly UK Ltd.

Vegreville holds a U.S. patent related to estimating environmental emissions from financial data.
