= Jacques Lewiner =

French physicist and inventor

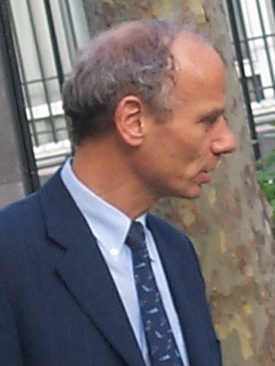
Lewiner in 1998

Jacques Lewiner (born in 1943) is a French physicist and inventor. He is professor and Honorary Scientific Director of École supérieure de physique et de chimie industrielles de la ville de Paris (ESPCI Paris), and (since 2012) dean of innovation and entrepreneurship at PSL Research University.

Jacques Lewiner has carried out basic and applied research in various domains of physics. Following his PhD, he taught at Catholic University of America and specialized in the study of the electrical properties of solid matter. Back in France he was nominated Professor in charge of the Electromagnetism Chair at ESPCI Paris where Georges Charpak arrived in 1980. From 1987 to 2001 he was directeur d'études at ESPCI Paris under the direction of Pierre-Gilles de Gennes.

Lewiner's works have been devoted to electrical insulators and particularly electrets, instrumentation and sensors, for instance in medical imaging, or on the improvement of telecommunication networks.

Jacques Lewiner has filed a large number of patent applications leading to industrial development, either through licenses granted to industrial companies or through start-up companies often created with former students or researchers. He has participated in the creation of various technology oriented start up companies, for instance Inventel, specializing in Telecommunications, Finsécur which develops and markets fire detection systems, Sculpteo which is an online 3D printing platform, Roowin in the field of chemical synthesis and Cynove in embedded electronics devices. Most of these companies have experienced a strong growth. For instance Inventel, which was the French leader for multimedia gateways was bought by Thomson SA in 2005. With Jean-Louis Viovy he created Fluigent which develops fluid motion systems for micro-fluidic applications.

Jacques Lewiner is laureate of the French Academy of Sciences in 1990, Knight in the National Order of the Legion of Honor, member of the French Academy of Technologies since 2005, Honorary Fellow of the Technion, Doctor Honoris Causa from Ben Gurion University of the Negev, Doctor Honoris Causa from Technion. In 2017 he has received the Marius Lavet Special Prize.

In 1968 he married Colette de Botton (who received her doctorate in physics in 1973 and has won several awards). They have three children. In 2005 Jacques and Colette Lewiner gave a large endowment to the Technion's Institute for Theoretical Physics, and in June 2006 a naming ceremony established the Lewiner Institute for Theoretical Physics.
