= Smart thermometer =

Online temperature sensor

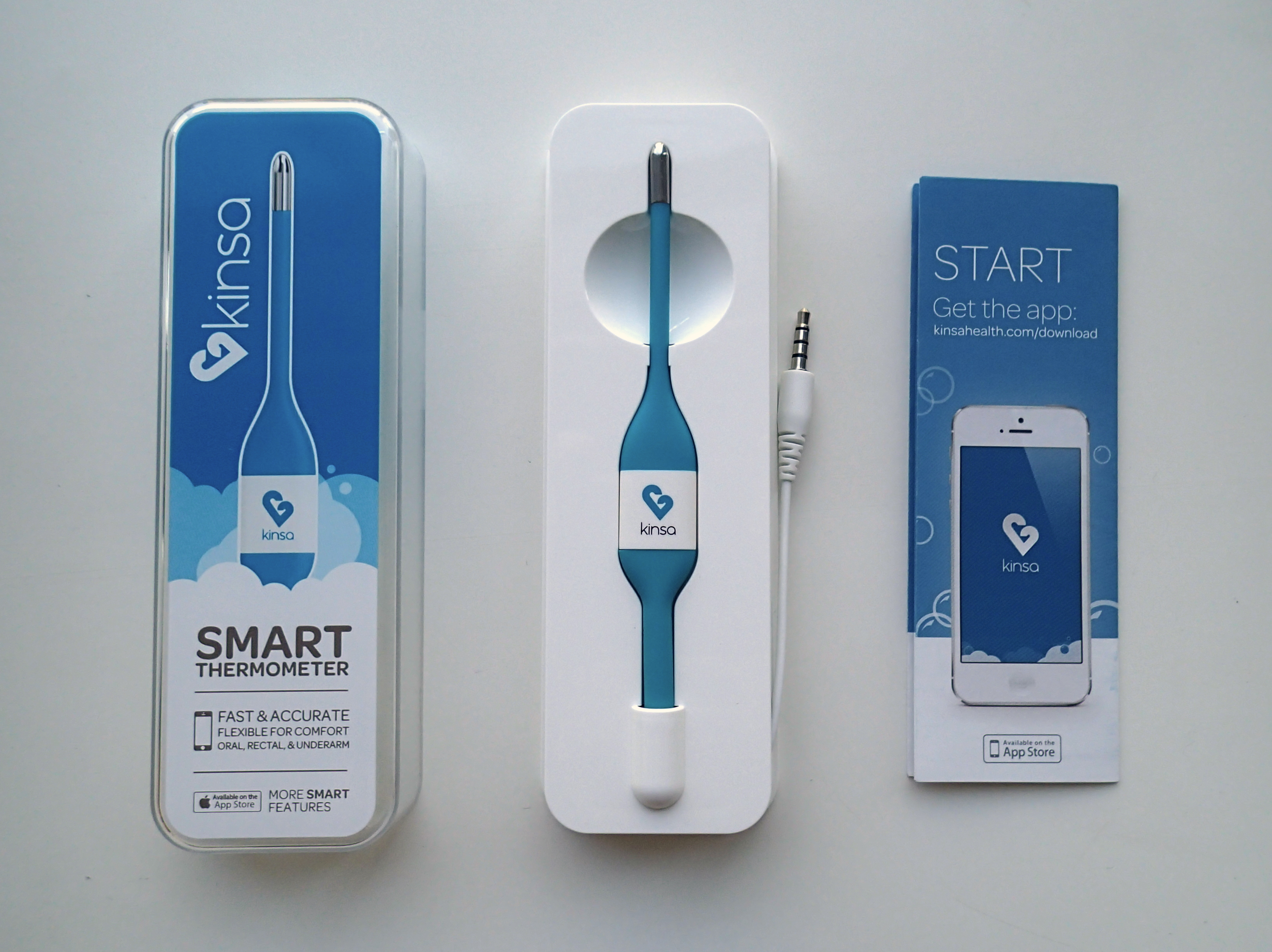

A smart thermometer is a medical thermometer which is able to transmit its readings so that they can be collected, stored and analyzed.

Since 2012 Kinsa has distributed smart thermometers to two million households across the US. The thermometers transmit their readings to an app on the users' phones. Users are then able to see a history of their temperature readings. The information is also consolidated to show an overall temperature map. This shows hot spots where the level of high temperatures is exceptional and so can be used to identify outbreaks of disease.

Continuous readings can be provided by wearable or adhesive thermometers but it is difficult to measure core body temperature in this way. Invasive sensors can be attached in a hospital setting such as intensive care or neonatal care. For more general use, form-factors such as arm bands and earbuds have been tried. Novel technologies under development include skin tattoos using flexible electronics and deep body heat flux sensors.
