= Philippe Dreyfus =

French informatics pioneer

Philippe Dreyfus was a French informatics pioneer.

After gaining his master's degree in physics in 1950 from the École supérieure de physique et de chimie industrielles de la ville de Paris, he became a professor at the Informatics faculty at Harvard University using Mark I, the first automated computer ever built. In 1958 he was nominated director of the Bull Calculus Centre. In 1962 he coined the new term informatique to refer to computer sciences in French.

In 1965 he became director of CAP Europe, an Anglo-French company, as well as director of CAP France and CAP UK. After CAP France and CAP Europe fused with Sogeti, and the consequent acquisition of american company Gemini Inc., he became in 1975 Vice-President of Sogeti. Philippe Dreyfus is a member of the European Computing Services Association (ECSA) Council and was the founder of Syntec Informatique. In 1962 he invented and defined the concept of programming language and in 1990 he introduced the concept of informativity (French: Informativité).
