= Gerard Dreyfus =

Gerard Dreyfus is an electrical engineer from ESPCI-PARISTECH in Paris, France. He was named a Fellow of the Institute of Electrical and Electronics Engineers (IEEE) in 2012, nominated by its Engineering in Medicine and Biology Society (EMBS) for his contributions to machine learning and its applications.
