= Arnaud Delubac =

French entrepreneur (born 1995)

- Born: 1995 (age 30–31); Paris, France
- Citizenship: French
- Education: ESSEC Business School; CentraleSupélec
- Occupations: Entrepreneur; Engineer

Arnaud Delubac (born 1995) is a French entrepreneur, best known as the co-founder of Greenly, a climate technology company specializing in carbon accounting software.

== Early life and education ==
Delubac was born in July 1995 in Paris, France. He studied management at the ESSEC Business School and engineering at CentraleSupélec. During his studies, he co-founded his first startup, Planshot, a social network designed to share spontaneous plans and ideas among friends.

== Career ==
=== Early career ===
Delubac later joined Withings for an internship, where he observed how digital technologies could measure previously invisible health indicators and create incentive-driven economic models. Delubac also worked in the French government, contributing to the digital communication strategies of Prime Minister Édouard Philippe, and Secretaries of State for Digital Affairs Mounir Mahjoubi and Cédric O.

=== Greenly ===
In 2019, Delubac co-founded Greenly with Alexis Normand and Matthieu Vegreville. Greenly provides a business-to-business (B2B) software platform for organizations to manage greenhouse gas accounting. Greenly raised 21 million euros in a Series A round in 2022 and 49 million euros in a Series B round in 2024 led by Fidelity International Strategic Ventures, with participation from Benhamou Global Ventures, Move Capital, HPE, HSBC, XAnge, and Energy Impact Partners. Delubac serves as the chief marketing officer of the company.

Delubac is also a director of Greenly UK Ltd. He was selected for the 2022 Forbes 30 Under 30 Europe list for his work at Greenly.
