= Mathias Fink =

French physicist (born 1945)

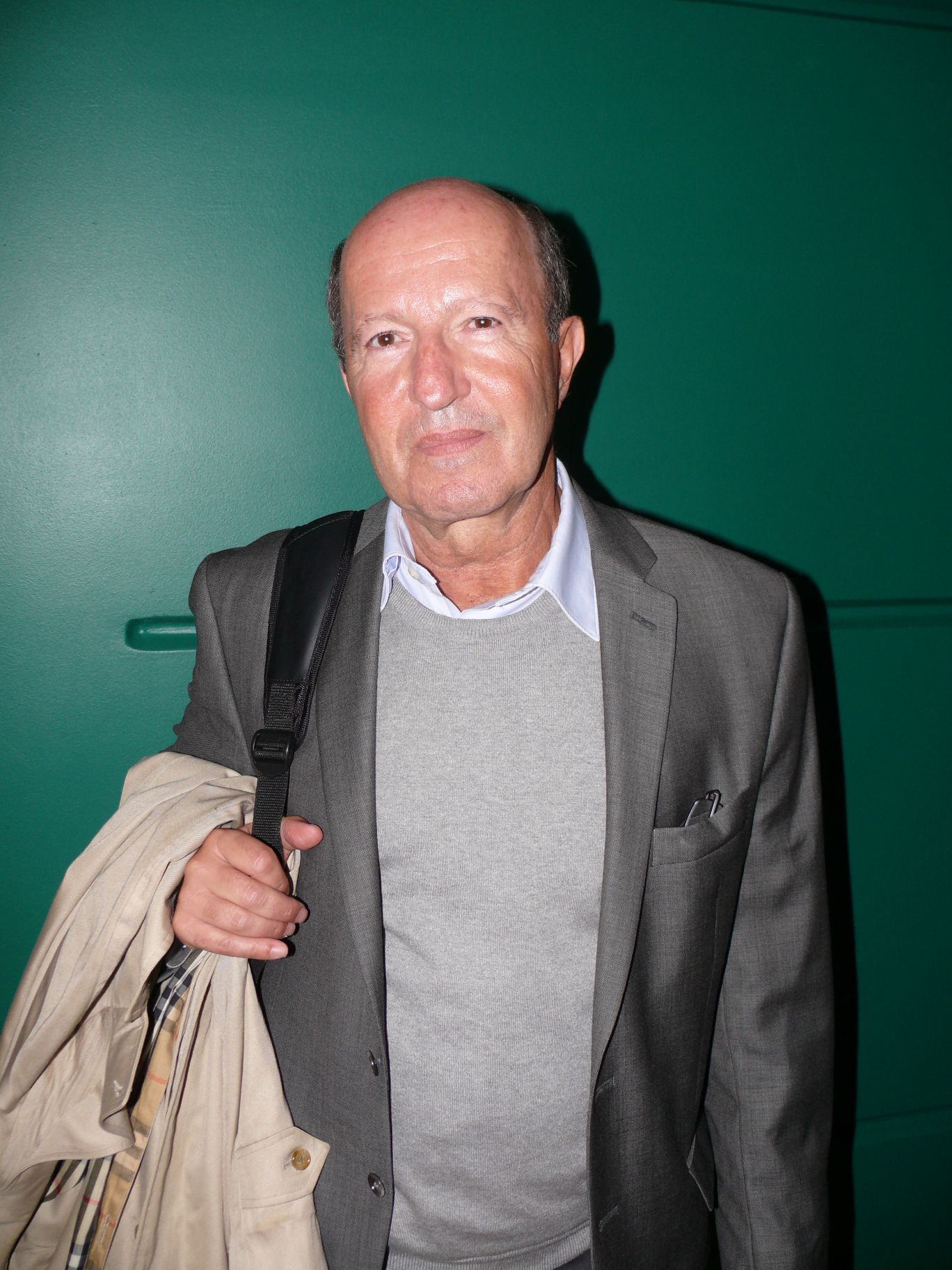
- Mathias Fink at the IEMN in 2012
- Born: 18 October 1945 (age 80); Grenoble, Isère, France
- Education: University of Paris-Sud
- Known for: Time reversal signal processing
- Scientific career
- Fields: Physics; Medical ultrasonography; Elastography
- Workplaces: University of Strasbourg; Paris Diderot University; ESPCI ParisTech; French Academy of Sciences; Collège de France
- Doctoral advisor: Pierre Alais
- Doctoral students: Claire Prada

Mathias Fink (born 18 October 1945) is a French physicist, professor at ESPCI Paris and member of the French Academy of Sciences. He is best known for his contributions to wave physics in complex media and its applications in imaging and telecommunications, such as time reversal signal processing.

== Life and career ==
Born in Grenoble, Mathias Fink received a M.S. degree in mathematics from Paris University, and the Ph.D. degree in solid state physics. Then he moved to medical imaging and received the Doctorat es-Sciences degree from Paris University in the area of ultrasonic focusing for real-time medical imaging under the direction of Pierre Alais (1978).

In 1981 he was appointed Professor at the University of Strasbourg. After a stay as a visiting professor at the University of Irvine in the radiology department he returned to France to become professor at the Paris Diderot University (Paris 7). In 1990 and founded the "Waves and Acoustics Laboratory" at ESPCI whose director he was and which became the Institut Langevin in 2009. 2005 he was appointed professor at ESPCI, where he now is professor emeritus and holds the Georges Charpak chair.

Fink pioneered the development of time-reversal mirrors and Time Reversal Signal Processing. He developed many applications of this concept from ultrasound therapy, medical imaging, non-destructive testing, underwater acoustics, seismic imaging, tactile objects, to electromagnetic telecommunications. He also pioneered innovative medical imaging methods: transient elastography, supersonic shear imaging and multi-wave imaging that are now implemented by several companies. Six companies with close to 400 employees have been created from his research: Echosens, Sensitive Object, Supersonic Imagine, Time Reversal Communications, Cardiawave, and GreenerWave.

== Honors and awards ==
- 1994 Grand prix de la créativité SNECMA
- 1995 Foucault prize of the French Physical Society
- 2002 elected to the French Academy of Engineering
- 2003 elected to the French Academy of Sciences
- 2006 Helmholtz-Rayleigh Interdisciplinary Silver Medal of the Acoustical Society of America
- 2007 Officer of the French Legion (since 2017 Commander)
- 2008 Louis Néel prize of the French Physical Society
- 2008/2009 Liliane Bettencourt Chair of Technological Innovation at the Collège de France
- 2014 Edwin H. Land Medal of the Optical Society and IS&T
- 2015 international colloquium in honor of his 70th birthday

== Selected works ==
- Fink, M.; Cardoso, J.-F. (1984). "Diffraction effects in pulse-echo measurement". IEEE Transactions on Sonics and Ultrasonics. 31 (4): 313–329. doi:10.1109/T-SU.1984.31512. S2CID 42526365.
- Derode, A.; Fink, M. (1994). "The notion of coherence in optics and its application to acoustics". Eur. J. Phys. 15 (2): 81–90. Bibcode:1994EJPh...15...81D. doi:10.1088/0143-0807/15/2/008. S2CID 250913039.
- Prada, C; F, M. (1994). "Eigenmodes of the time reversal operator: a solution to selective focusing in multiple target media". Wave Motion. 20 (2): 151–163. Bibcode:1994WaMot..20..151P. doi:10.1016/0165-2125(94)90039-6.
- Roux, P.; de Rosny, J.; Tanter, M.; Fink, M. (1997). "The Aharonov-Bohm effect revisited by an acoustic time-reversal mirror" (PDF). Phys. Rev. Lett. 79 (17): 3170–3173. Bibcode:1997PhRvL..79.3170R. doi:10.1103/PhysRevLett.79.3170.
- Mathias Fink (1997). "Time Reversed Acoustics". Physics Today. 50 (3): 34–40. Bibcode:1997PhT....50c..34F. doi:10.1063/1.881692.
- Fink, Mathias; Prada, Claire (2000). "Time-reversed acoustics - Topical review". Rep. Prog. Phys. 63: 1933. doi:10.1088/0034-4885/63/12/202. S2CID 250901143.
- Bercoff, J.; Tanter, M.; Fink, M. (2004). "Supersonic Shear Imaging: a new technique for soft tissues elasticity mapping". IEEE Transactions on Ultrasonics, Ferroelectrics, and Frequency Control. 51 (4): 374–409. doi:10.1109/TUFFC.2004.1295425. PMID 15139541. S2CID 99105.
- Tanter, Mickael; Fink, Mathias (2014). "Ultrafast imaging in biomedical ultrasound". IEEE Transactions on Ultrasonics, Ferroelectrics, and Frequency Control. 61 (1): 102–119. doi:10.1109/TUFFC.2014.2882. PMID 24402899.
- M. Fink (2009). Renversement du temps, ondes et innovation (in French). Ed. Fayard. ISBN 978-2213644134.
