= Time reversal signal processing =

Time reversal signal processing is a signal processing technique that has three main uses: creating an optimal carrier signal for communication, reconstructing a source event, and focusing high-energy waves to a point in space. A Time Reversal Mirror (TRM) is a device that can focus waves using the time reversal method. TRMs are also known as time reversal mirror arrays since they are usually arrays of transducers. TRM are well-known and have been used for decades in the optical domain. They are also used in the ultrasonic domain.

== Overview ==
If the source is passive, i.e. some type of isolated reflector, an iterative technique can be used to focus energy on it. The TRM transmits a plane wave which travels toward the target and is reflected off it. The reflected wave returns to the TRM, where it looks as if the target has emitted a (weak) signal. The TRM reverses and retransmits the signal as usual, and a more focused wave travels toward the target. As the process is repeated, the waves become more and more focused on the target.

Yet another variation is to use a single transducer and an ergodic cavity. Intuitively, an ergodic cavity is one that will allow a wave originating at any point to reach any other point. An example of an ergodic cavity is an irregularly shaped swimming pool: if someone dives in, eventually the entire surface will be rippling with no clear pattern. If the propagation medium is lossless and the boundaries are perfect reflectors, a wave starting at any point will reach all other points an infinite number of times. This property can be exploited by using a single transducer and recording for a long time to get as many reflections as possible.

== Theory ==
The time reversal technique is based upon a feature of the wave equation known as reciprocity: given a solution to the wave equation, then the time reversal (using a negative time) of that solution is also a solution. This occurs because the standard wave equation only contains even order derivatives. Some media are not reciprocal (e.g. very lossy or noisy media), but many very useful ones are approximately so, including sound waves in water or air, ultrasonic waves in human bodies, and electromagnetic waves in free space. The medium must also be approximately linear.

Time reversal techniques can be modeled as a matched filter. If a delta function is the original signal, then the received signal at the TRM is the impulse response of the channel. The TRM sends the reversed version of the impulse response back through the same channel, effectively autocorrelating it. This autocorrelation function has a peak at the origin, where the original source was. The signal is concentrated in both space and time (in many applications, autocorrelation functions are functions of time only).

Another way to think of a time reversal experiment is that the TRM is a "channel sampler". The TRM measures the channel during the recording phase, and uses that information in the transmission phase to optimally focus the wave back to the source.

== Experiments ==
A notable researcher is Mathias Fink of École Supérieure de Physique et de Chimie Industrielles de la Ville de Paris. His team has done numerous experiments with ultrasonic TRMs. An interesting experiment involved a single source transducer, a 96-element TRM, and 2000 thin steel rods located between the source and the array. The source sent a 1 μs pulse both with and without the steel scatterers. The source point was measured for both time width and spatial width in the retransmission step. The spatial width was about 6 times narrower with the scatterers than without. Moreover, the spatial width was less than the diffraction limit as determined by the size of the TRM with the scatterers. This is possible because the scatterers increased the effective aperture of the array. Even when the scatterers were moved slightly (on the order of a wavelength) in between the receive and transmit steps, the focusing was still quite good, showing that time reversal techniques can be robust in the face of a changing medium.

In addition, José M. F. Moura of Carnegie Mellon University has led a research team working to extend the principles of Time Reversal to electromagnetic waves, and they have achieved resolution in excess of the Rayleigh resolution limit, proving the efficacy of Time Reversal techniques. Their efforts are focused on radar systems, and trying to improve detection and imaging schemes in highly cluttered environments, where Time Reversal techniques seem to provide the greatest benefit.

== Applications ==
The benefit of time reversal signal processing is that one need not know any details of the channel. The step of sending a wave through the channel effectively measures it, and the retransmission step uses this data to focus the wave. Thus one doesn't have to solve the wave equation to optimize the system, one only needs to know that the medium is reciprocal. Time reversal is therefore suited to applications with inhomogeneous media.

An attractive aspect of time reversal signal processing is the fact that it makes use of multipath propagation. Many wireless communication systems must compensate and correct for multipath effects. Time reversal techniques use multipath to their advantage by using the energy from all paths.

Fink imagines a cryptographic application based on the ergodic cavity configuration. The key would be composed of the locations of two transducers. One plays the message, the other records waves after they have bounced throughout the cavity; this recording will look like noise. When the recorded message is time reversed and played back, there is only one location to launch the waves from in order for them to focus. Given that the playback location is correct, only one other location will exhibit the focused message wave; all other locations should look noisy.

== See also ==
- Phase conjugation
