= Inder Singh (philanthropist) =

American philanthropist (born 1977)

Inder Singh is the founder and CEO of Kinsa. He formerly served as the Executive Vice President of the Clinton Foundation's Clinton Health Access Initiative, a global non-profit organization fighting malaria and other diseases. Singh is known for his work towards improving global health, most notably by brokering the deals announced by former President Clinton that reduced the price of life-saving treatments throughout the developing world, particularly aiding in malaria eradication. Singh is credited with saving over $1 billion in drug costs for developing nations. More than 2.6 million HIV/AIDS patients have received drugs subsidized through CHAI, and more than 30 million malaria patients have received drugs produced at lower cost thanks to CHAI licensing deals.

== Global health ==
At CHAI, Singh built and managed a team of 55 professionals with operations across ten countries. He pioneered a series of innovative, market-based approaches to address health and alleviate poverty. Notably, Singh negotiated most of the deals that former President Clinton announced on reduced drug pricing for HIV/AIDS and malaria over the past five years. Singh worked closely with companies, international donors, and governments to develop sustainable, profitable business models for the production of life-saving medicines and diagnostics. He and his teams struck agreements with more than 20 companies in the U.S., India, China and Europe resulting in price reductions of up to 90%, nearly $1.5 billion in cost savings, and the development of more than 40 generic or new drug presentations. The work enabled 1.7 million more HIV-positive people to receive treatment, and supported access to advanced anti-malarial medicines for tens of millions. Through CHAI, Singh has overseen the distribution of millions of dollars in anti-malaria supplies and equipment. CHAI also works to enable longer-term development and licensing of anti-malarial drugs. In 2008, Singh gained note for negotiating a licensing agreement to allow the production of artemisinin, a key anti-malarial ingredient, at 70% below the then-current market price. By reducing the price, it was possible to provide malaria treatment to 12 million additional residents of Africa and south Asia. Malaria currently afflicts between 300 million and 500 million people per year and kills more than 700,000.

Equally importantly, Singh has become a prominent speaker before national and international bodies. For example, in both March and May 2010, he advocated before the World Health Organization for improved HIV/AIDS access in developing nations. In 2011, he was the keynote speaker before a blue-ribbon group at the University of Pennsylvania to advocate for greater U.S. involvement in global healthcare.

== Kinsa ==
Kinsa's mission is to create a real-time map of human health to empower society with the information to track and stop the spread of disease. Kinsa gathers the data to map health using smartphone-connected sensors. Kinsa's first product is an ultra-low-cost smartphone-connected thermometer designed specifically for peace of mind. By combining a thermometer with a smartphone, Kinsa "turns a thermometer into a communication device" with people who have just fallen ill. In addition to providing a temperature readout, this thermometer, marketed as the "world's smartest thermometer," tracks symptoms, enables one to get advice directly from a medical professional, and see the "health weather" in the local area to know whether flu or strep throat is circulating. Using the smartphone display and audio, it is also designed to ease taking a child's temperature by creating an engaging experience for both a child and parent.

== Early life and education ==
Singh was born in Ross Township, Pennsylvania, a small town near Pittsburgh. His parents were immigrants from the Punjab and Lahore regions of India. Visits to their homes in India inspired Singh to become an advocate for global drug development. Singh holds five post-secondary degrees. He first attended the University of Michigan, where he graduated magna cum laude. While an undergraduate student, Singh founded the charity Dance Marathon, Inc., which has raised more than $4.1 million to support childhood rehabilitation hospitals. He then earned degrees from the MIT Sloan School of Management and the Harvard Kennedy School, and the Harvard-MIT Division of Health Sciences & Technology. He worked briefly at for-profit startup companies in Silicon Valley before joining the Clinton Foundation. Prior to becoming Executive Vice President of CHAI, Singh served as Director of Drug Access at the Clinton Foundation. Prior to CHAI, Singh worked at three technology startups, in consulting, and in business development. He also started a successful nonprofit organization that supports children undergoing physical rehabilitation. Inder Singh is married with two children.
