= Orange Livebox =

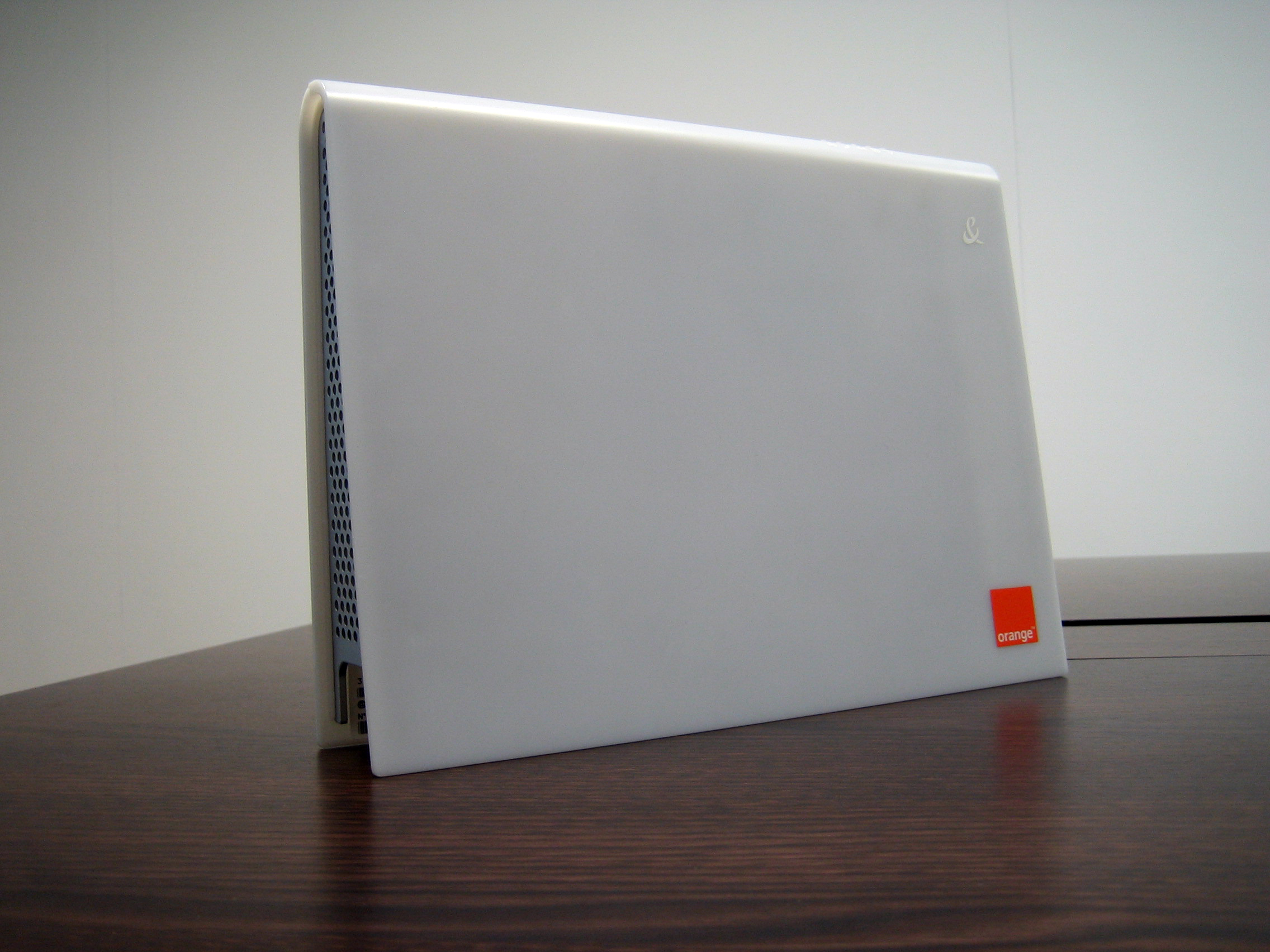
Livebox 1.1

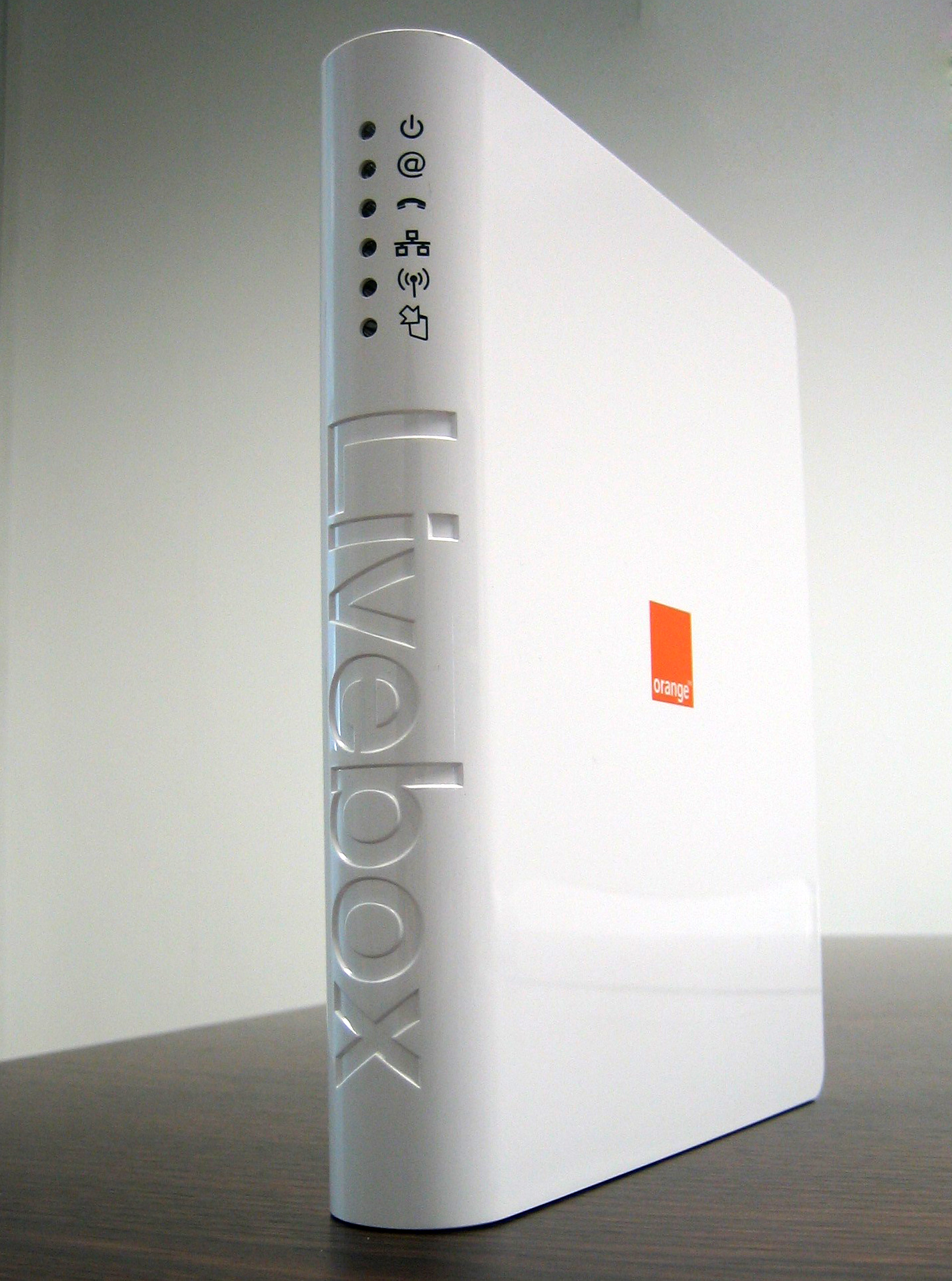
Livebox 1.2

Livebox Pro

Orange Livebox is an ADSL wireless router available to customers of Orange's Broadband services in Kenya, Guinea, France, Tunisia, Spain, Jordan, the Netherlands, Switzerland, Poland, Belgium, The United Kingdom (Formerly), Mauritian partner MyT, Lightspeed Communications in Bahrain and Orange Botswana. Depending on the model, it is manufactured by Inventel, Sagemcom or ZTE. The Livebox is also known as FunBox in some countries like Poland, Ivory Coast and Senegal.

== Features ==
- 802.11b/g (Wifi n for Livebox 2) Wi-Fi router
- Ethernet ports
- RJ11 socket for VoIP calls using 'Second Line' (The name of Orange's VOIP Service).
- USB host port specifically for using a standard USB printer on the network, which Orange is calling "Liveprinter"
- USB port for connection to a PC

Although hardware for these services is built into every Livebox, some (Bluetooth and Live Printer) are only activated by firmware updates. Currently, the latest firmware is v5.10.7-uk for the UK.

With hacking, and possibly in future firmware releases, it may be possible to use other hardware, such as hard drives, with the USB host port. Due to deliberate restrictions embedded in the firmware, Liveboxes in the UK are locked to Orange. As a result, they will not work with other ISP's. However, hackers have found ways to circumvent this restriction by overwriting the firmware.

== Second Line ==
Second Line is Orange's VoIP service through the Livebox. In the United Kingdom, France and Spain it is free to call national, international landlines as well as other Livebox numbers and Orange mobile numbers. Additionally, the UK Livebox allows free calls to Orange mobile phones and 30 countries (providing the call is made from the Orange Second Line to a landline in that country. A list of these countries can be found here.

The original Livebox second line plan "Talk Unlimited" on Orange Broadband Unlimited plan at UK's Livebox launch was calls to 100 countries, UK 01 and 02 landlines including Orange UK mobiles (where a customer had an Orange mobile plan) as listed above in the pdf, 03 UK landlines were added when UK telecom regulator released the 03 prefix. 1000 minutes Fair Usage Policy was later introduced which affected both the 30/100 countries package when 30 countries plan launched. Free calls will be disconnected after two hours, at which time one can then redial. Orange Broadband Unlimited was discounted by £15 for Orange Mobile customers at this point to just £5.

Using the device in Jordan, it is free to call other Orange Livebox subscribers. It costs 10p per minute to call any other mobiles. UK Livebox phone numbers begin with 0845, but other UK standard area codes can be selected from the Orange Broadband members centre, which allows free calls between UK to UK Livebox numbers. Using the default 0845 number provided by Orange means Livebox to Livebox calls will be charged at the 0845 non-geographic rate rather than free.

However, the free Orange Mobile calls only apply to users using the Home Select or Home Max Packages, and they must be Orange Pay Monthly users (as per the old 100 countries Unlimited plan). Users can enter their contract ID into their Member Centre configuration pages.

In the firmware update of February 2008, the ability to adjust the audio quality of the VoIP service was added.

Orange Unique launched in 2006 with expensive Animal Canary or Panther mobile Unique plans allows free calls over UMA (wifi connected calls from Orange UMA enabled mobile); this allowed Orange mobile users free calls to UK landline 01 02, UK non-geographic 03 and Orange UK mobile calls and landlines in 30 countries as per the newer Livebox package when calls started over wifi (and continued to be free when call transferred seamlessly over to Orange UK mobile network). Later the Unique plan above was FREE on any price plan, then optional £1 for Orange UK calls, £3 for UK landlines & Orange or £5 for both and included the 30 International landlines. Orange dropped these Unique packages later (circa 2008?) and all Unique/UMA calls are now billed/deducted as per your mobile contract allowances/rates. Original Unique customers continue to have these additional bolt/add on plans kept on mobile plans/accounts, unavailable for new customers.

=== Discontinuation of Second Line Service ===
The Second Line was a VOIP service which included a separate telephone number, was withdrawn for new customers on 17 September 2010.

In September 2011, Orange Shops in the UK began offering the Netgear DGN1000 router which has no facility to accommodate a Second Line making the service a legacy only facility. As of August 2012, existing customers are being notified that the Second Line service will be discontinued from 17 September 2012 and any calls made using the Second Line will be charged at the standard rate by the customer's line rental provider.

Orange help pages still refer to the Livebox when setting up broadband and include references to the Second Line.

==== Definite discontinuation of second line service in 2013 ====
In December 2012, Some existing users of the second line have started receiving a letter from Orange stating that "from February 2013, your second line service will no longer be available." The letter just explains that it is "because the system we use to provide your second line is closing". In replacement of VOIP, some customers may be offered free calls from their main home phone line with the "new Bright Box" consisting of: free calls to UK landlines 01, 02 and non-geographic 03; some UK mobile minutes and any time landline calls to 64 countries.

Orange are now quoting an end date 27 March 2013 for all remaining Livebox Second Line customers.

== Digital television ==
=== UK ===
In the firmware update of February 2008, IPTV support was added via the Yellow Ethernet port and would be for Orange customers who had been in the network area (LLU). This was in advance of a Digital Television service from Orange that was supposed to launch later in 2008. Orange did undertake trials of the service, but announced in November 2008 that they would not be rolling the service out.

=== France ===
IPTV has been available to French Customers since 2006 through the Livebox under the name Orange TV. Orange TV currently delivers 160 channels (of which 26 are in HD, 1 in 3D and all the Freeview channels). It also gives access to Canal+, VOD, Deezer and Dailymotion.

=== Spain ===
An IPTV service is available to most Spanish customers via an extra decoder box that connects to the yellow Ethernet port of the Livebox. The service allows for streaming of several free channels, while others require a paid subscription.

Some sport events and movies are available on a pay-per-view scheme.

The decoder can be connected to an aerial allowing for free-to-air channel reception via digital terrestrial television.

== Livebox 2 ==
In 2009, Orange launched Livebox 2 in France and Spain, and later also in Poland and Belgium. This device is Wi-Fi N enabled.

It includes 2 USB ports for disk and printer sharing, 2 FXS ports to connect standard phones, Wi-Fi on/off button, and 4 Ethernet ports.

The new Livebox has a pairing mode for Wi-Fi: Wifi Protected Setup (WPS). In December 2011 WPS was shown to be vulnerable to brute-force attacks, and should not be considered secure.

The new router includes DLNA, so all the devices connected to the Livebox (via Ethernet or Wi-Fi) can share the contents of the USB disks connected to the Livebox. The devices can also access a shared printer connected to one of the router's USB port.

Orange currently have no plans to release the Livebox 2.0 in the UK market, instead opting to keep the current Livebox 1.0 (Livebox 1.2 no longer stocked) and the Siemens Gigaset 572 Router.

== Livebox Pro ==
A more upmarket version was released in 2011. Connectivity is similar to the Livebox 2, but it has a small LCD colour display with menu buttons, and is intended for the small business market.

== Design ==
Livebox 1.1 and 1.2 have been designed by Boris Gentine, a designer at Saguez and Partners. They were designed to harmoniously fit in homes and to be laid both vertically or horizontally. This design has been rewarded twice. In 2005, France Telecom launched a "Livebox Fashion" and also a "Livebox Music"; in the same year stickers were offered to personalise it and synthetic fur covers were also offered to promote the King Kong film.
