= Inventel =

French electronics company

- Industry: telecommunications
- Founded: Paris, France (1990)
- Headquarters: Paris, France
- Products: telecommunications service, electronics, communications systems

Inventel was a French company developing consumer electronics and communication systems, noted for domestic gateways and considered one of the primary architects of Triple play in Europe. Founded in 1990 in Paris by Jacques Lewiner and Eric Carreel, the company was acquired by Thomson SA in 2005.

== History ==
Inventel was founded in 1990 by two researchers from ESPCI ParisTech, Jacques Lewiner and Eric Carreel, who later co-founded Withings. The company was successful at commercializing scientific research, and providing full product development (software, electronics, and mechanical) in-house.

In the 90's Inventel succeeded in the pagers market with Tam Tam: a paging service using the ERMES standard, which was marketed by large operators.

In 1997, Inventel began its engineering activities in DECT. Since then, many Inventel features for DECT phones have been distributed by the major European operators. By 1999, Inventel was working on a device integrating wired and wireless voice and data. The BlueDSL was released in 2001. In 2001, Inventel accepted a €6 million investment from Banexi Ventures and Innovacom.

Inventel became the first major manufacturer of ADSL wireless secured access, with the DWB200 released in 2002. Further ADSL modems for wireless hotspots and the consumer electronics market were developed, including the Livebox gateway which was distributed by France Telecom and several other European operators.

In March 2005, Thomson announced the acquisition of Inventel. Based in the 5th arrondissement of Paris near the École supérieure de physique et de chimie industrielles de la ville de Paris, the company had around 75 employees when it was acquired by Thomson.
