= French Academy of Technologies =

Learned society with an emphasis on technology

The National Academy of Technologies of France (French: Académie des technologies) is a learned society, founded in 2000, with an emphasis on technology, and the newest of French academies. In 2007 it acquired the status of établissement public, which enforces its public role.

== History ==
The idea of the Academy of Technology was launched in 1997 by mathematician Jacques-Louis Lions, then President of the French Academy of Sciences. The reform was confirmed in 1998 by the Council of Applications of the Academy of Sciences (CADAS), which would be followed by the Academy of Technology. The Academy was founded on 12 December 2000. The first President was Pierre Castillon.

In March 2007, it became a public institution of administrative nature under the Law on the Research Program of 2006. It is placed under the protection of the President of the French Republic. In 2021 the academy had approximately 350 active members, including emeritus and foreign members.

== Organisation ==
It is organised into a number of commissions, committees, and work groups on subjects including information technology, ethics, energy and the environment, transport, simulation, defense, etc.

== Activities ==
The academy's objective is to provide scientific and technical expertise to public authorities, businesses and civil society. Its civil service status gives the academy an advisory role to the French government. The ten departments of the academy provide communications, conclusions, reports and expert opinions in various fields.

The Academy is a member of Euro-CASE, a European federation of 21 technology academies, uniting 6,000 experts, and CAETS, the International Council of Academies of Technology.

== Missions ==
Its stated missions are as follows:

- Help to better exploit technologies in service of mankind
- Provide clarity on emerging technologies
- Contribute to public discussion of the risks and benefits of technologies
- Contribute to professional and technological education
- Interest the young and their parents in technologies and new careers
- Raise public interest and comprehension in technologies.

== See also ==
- French Academy of Sciences
- Institut de France, French learned society, grouping five académies, including the famous Académie française and the French Academy of Sciences.
