= Withings =

French consumer electronics company

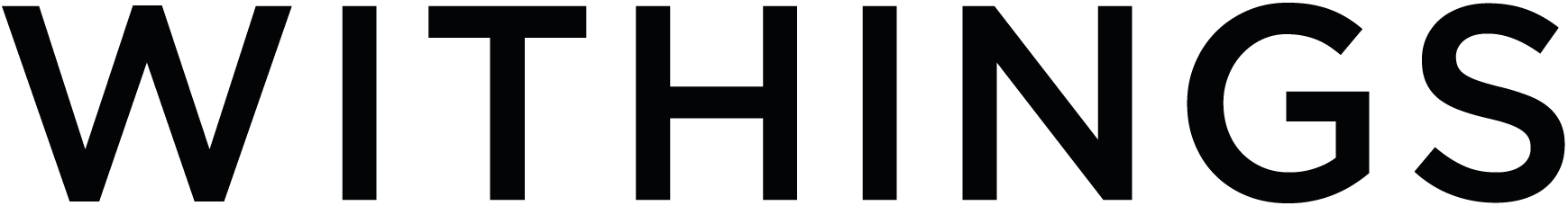
- Type: Private
- Industry: Consumer electronics
- Founded: (June 2008; 18 years ago) in Issy-les-Moulineaux, France
- Founders: Éric Carreel; Cédric Hutchings; Fred Potter
- Headquarters: 2 rue Maurice Hartmann, Issy-les-Moulineaux, France
- Area served: Worldwide
- Key people: Éric Carreel (Chairman)
- Products: Smart devices including: Smartwatches, Scales, Blood pressure monitors, Thermometers, Health monitors, Companion apps
- Brands: Withings
- Parent: Nokia (2016-2018)
- Website: withings.com withingshealthsolutions.com

Withings (IPA: /ˈwiːθɪŋz/) is a French consumer electronics company headquartered in Issy-les-Moulineaux, France. It also has offices in Boston, Massachusetts, United States, and Hong Kong, and distributes its products worldwide. Withings is known for design and innovation in connected devices, such as the first Wi-Fi scale on the market (introduced in 2009), an FDA-cleared blood pressure monitor, a smart sleep system, and a line of automatic activity tracking watches. It also provides B2B services for healthcare providers and researchers.

Withings was purchased by Finnish company Nokia on 26 April 2016 and became a division of Nokia known as Nokia Health. The Withings brand continued to be used until June 2017, when it was replaced by the Nokia brand. In May 2018, Éric Carreel, Withings' founder, finalized a deal to regain control and the company became independent again, under the Withings name.

== History ==
=== Early history ===
Withings was founded in 2008 by three executives from the technology and telecom industries: Éric Carreel (CEO), who was co-founder of Inventel; Cédric Hutchings; and Fred Potter.

In September 2010, Withings received its first venture capital funding – $3.8 million from Ventech – to fund the development of the company's next two products. In January 2011, Withings announced at the Consumer Electronics Show in Las Vegas that its second product would be a blood pressure monitor that connects to the iPhone. It also announced it would produce a baby monitor for use with smartphones and other connected devices, which was made available to purchase across Europe in November 2011 and in the United States in February 2012.

Withings received a $30 million investment from Bpifrance, Idinvest Partners, 360 CapitalPartners, and Ventech in July 2013. The company integrated with Apple's HealthKit platform in October 2014. The compatibility across Withings' range of connected devices enabled the integration of personal data into the iOS Health app. For accounts created on or after 13 October 2026, the integration is a paid feature.

At WebSummit in Dublin, 2015, the company announced a partnership with MyFitnessPal. The partnership combined Withings' Health Mate app with MyFitnessPal's nutrition data to let the users know whether they were exercising enough in relation to their diet.

=== 2016 to 2018; Acquisition by Nokia ===
In April 2016, Nokia announced it had struck a deal to acquire Withings and integrate it with the group's Nokia Technologies division. The acquisition closed on 31 May 2016. The CEO of Withings, Cédric Hutchings, became the leader of the new Digital Health business of Nokia Technologies. At the time of the acquisition, the Withings brand was said to continue to exist, at least for the time being; however, by the winter of 2016, the brand had already transitioned from the original "Withings Inspire Health" to "Withings Part of Nokia".

On February 26, 2017, it was announced that Withings would no longer be used as a brand: its devices would be sold under the Nokia brand. The rebranding was completed on June 20, 2017.

=== 2018 to present; Purchase by Éric Carreel ===
On May 2, 2018, Nokia announced plans to sell its health tech business to Withings co-founder Éric Carreel. The sale was completed at the end of that month. Carreel had left Nokia in 2017 and completed the purchase of Withings later in 2018.

In April 2019, Withings relocated a factory in France. The same year, it also released three new products including the Withings Move, a customizable smartwatch.

Withings acquired both device company Impeto Medical as well as the personalized fitness and meal planning app 8fit in 2022. It incorporated technology for monitoring peripheral neuropathies into its smart scale products which was launched the same year. In 2023, it presented U-Scan, a reader and replaceable cartridge for individual urine testing, set to be released in late 2024.

In October 2026, Withings made automatic syncing of data to Apple Health and other third-party apps, including Health Connect, part of its paid Withings+ subscription for accounts created on or after 13 October 2026; accounts created before that date retain free syncing. The company attributed the change to updates to its API and new privacy measures introduced with its Withings AI Connector. The change was criticised by users.

== Products ==
=== Smart watches and fitness trackers ===
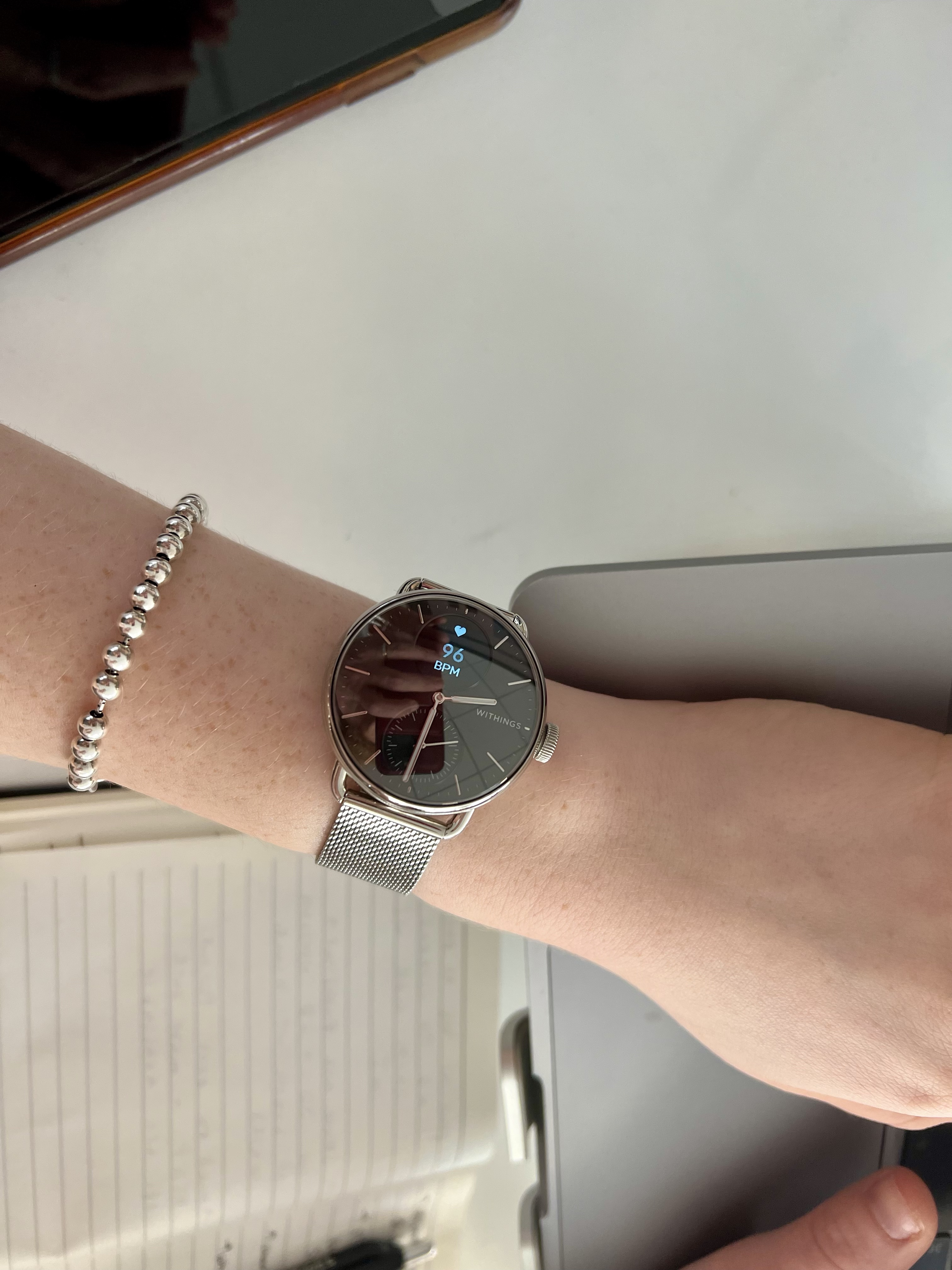
Withings ScanWatch 2

Withings manufactures smart watches and fitness trackers, including the Activité, an activity tracking watch which was the first smartwatch to resemble a traditional wristwatch. It has no buttons and is controlled from a phone app, compatible with both iPhone and Android. It can track the user's sleep, swimming, walking and running automatically. It also incorporates weight, heart rate, and body mass data from Withings' wireless scales, like the Smart Body Analyzer.

The company also manufactures the Activité Steel which is made of stainless steel with chrome hands and a silicone strap. Other models include the Activité Sapphire and the Activité Pop. One of the users of Activité is former French president François Hollande.

Withings' first product since being purchased by Carreel in 2019 is the Steel HR Sport smartwatch, a fitness tracker with the appearance of a watch. It is a hybrid and provides heart rate monitoring, GPS tracking, and fitness level analytics including oxygen intake sensors. It is the first Withings product to offer fitness level assessments. Withings also unveiled the Withings Move at CES 2019. This is an entry-level smartwatch with an ECG version that has embedded electrocardiogram tracking.

The ScanWatch is a smartwatch that incorporates a sensor that measures the oxygen saturation level in the blood to identify sleep apnea and detects atrial fibrillation. It also has a built-in ECG tool and monitors workouts and exercises.

=== Scales ===
In 2009, Withings released a WiFi Body Scale which was the first connected body scale. It measures weight and fat mass and sends data to the user's app over Wi-Fi, and also connects to platforms such as Google Health and Microsoft HealthVault as well as diet and exercise sites such as DailyBurn.

In 2012, Withings announced an internet-connected baby and toddler scale at the 2012 Consumer Electronics Show. It was the first scale of its kind and won a CES Innovations Award. It also produced the Withings Smart Body Analyzer, a smart scale that measures weight and calculates body mass index and fat mass. The scales received media attention when magician Penn Jillette, having lost nearly 120 pounds in four months to preserve his health, attributed his success to a strict regimen and the Withings smart scale.

Its Body Scan scale was launched in 2022, and it can perform an electrocardiogram and measure nervous activity. Body Scan launched in the United States in 2023 after it received FDA clearance. It also released the Body Comp and Body Smart scales that integrate with the Withings+ in-app service to provide advice and workouts based on body composition measurements.

=== Health monitors ===
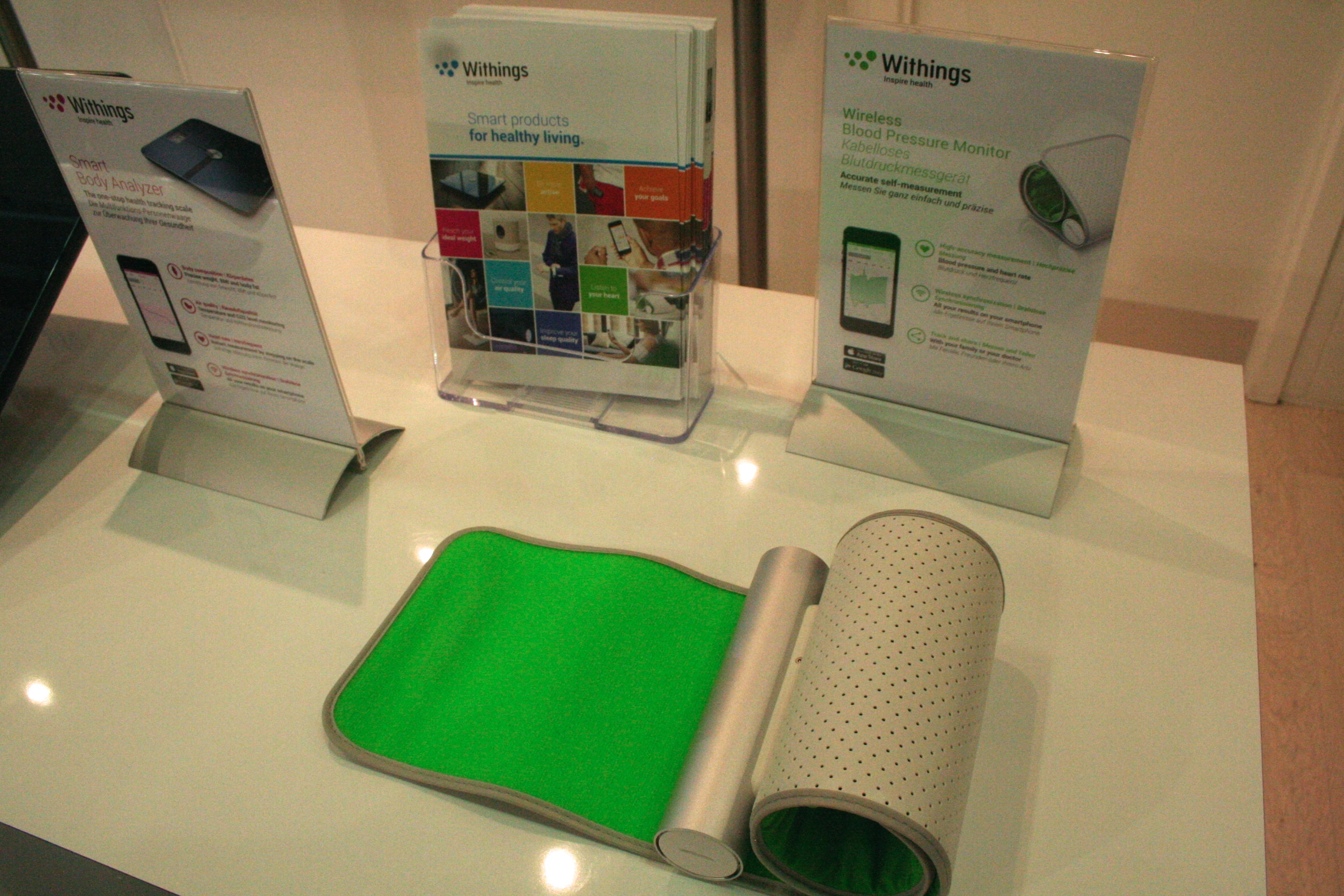
Withings blood pressure monitor

In 2011, Withings released the first connected blood pressure monitor, which was upgraded in March 2014 to a wireless version to connect to iOS and Android mobile devices. Approved by the FDA, the device allows patients to chart their blood pressure readings at home: it measures systolic and diastolic blood pressure as well as heart rate. The BPM Core, introduced in 2019, adds an ECG function and a digital stethoscope which listens for some heart valve defects.

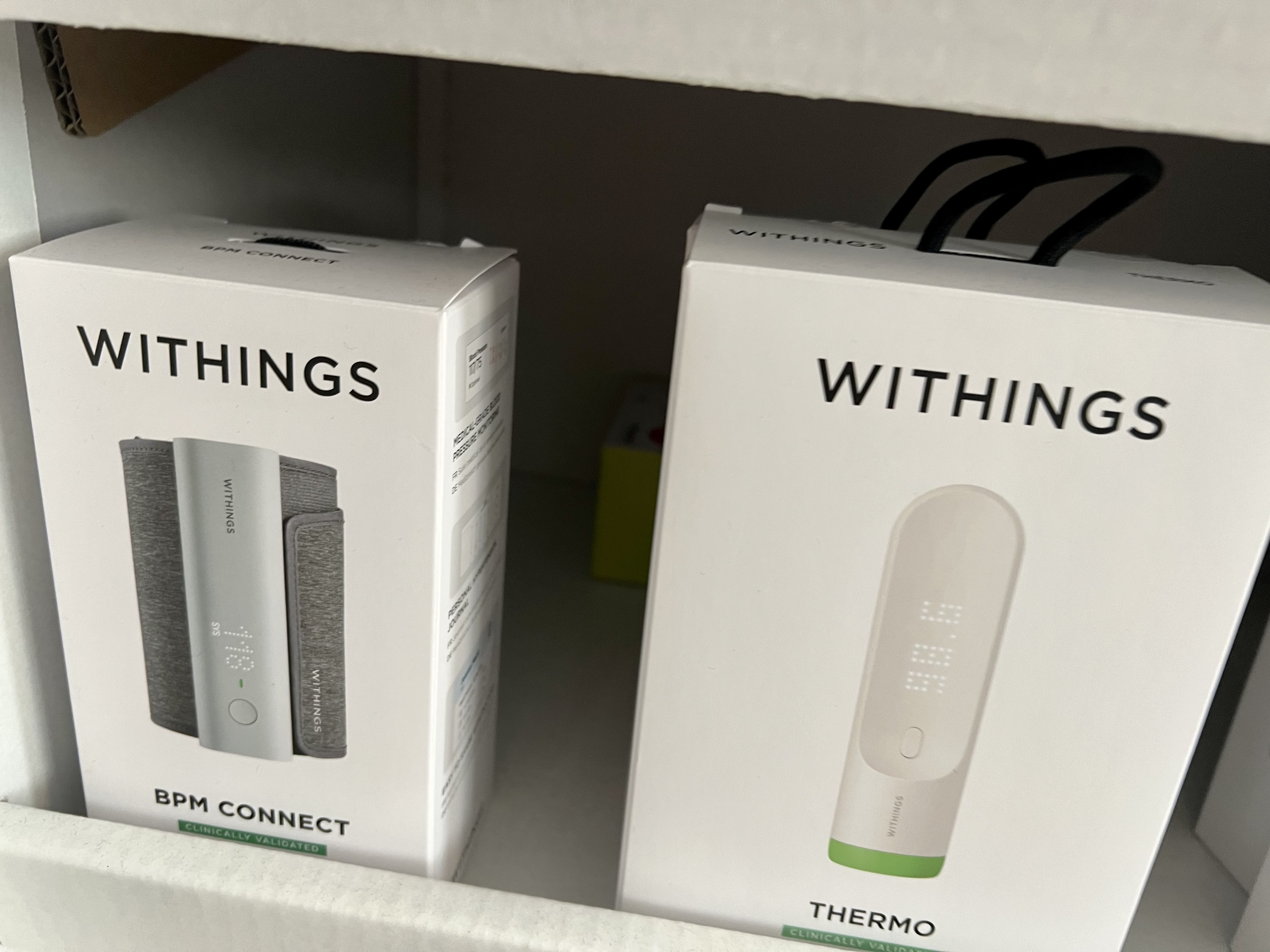
Withings BPM Connect (left) and Thermo (right)

Withings Thermo is a temporal artery thermometer which uses a 16-sensor array to deliver fast and accurate temperature readings. The thermometer displays the temperature, storing data to be analyzed and presented in the accompanying app. Its Wi-Fi and Bluetooth connectivity allows smartphone users to log readings, along with other information such as symptoms and medication. The device stores profiles of several people and its batteries last for about two years. Thermo won two 2016 CES Innovation Awards (Best in Fitness, Sport and Biotech, and Tech for a Better World).

In 2023, Withings released a urine testing system called U-Scan. The device is placed in a toilet and allows for daily urine tests, with results reported to the user electronically. It analyses diet and hydration as well as hormonal changes in women. The information collected can also be accessed by a person's healthcare professional, with the permission of the patient.

=== Withings app ===
Withings has a mobile application that connects with many of its devices and shows activity and sleep trends over time in graphs. The app also tracks weight, heart rate, blood pressure and more if the user enters the data or owns a Withings smart scale or blood pressure monitor. It can be integrated with Apple Watch.

=== Business-to-business products ===
In 2019, Withings launched a line of business-to-business products known as Withings Health Solutions, for personal users and healthcare providers, that aims to track the wellness of patients to assist with chronic disease prevention, remote monitoring, and clinical research. Withings allows researchers and healthcare providers to use the Withings platform or their own platform to track the data which users allow to be collected. Since 2023, Withings has allowed American Diabetes Association members to have free access to smart scale data and live coaching through its database.

=== Former products ===
Withings produced Aura, a smart alarm clock with sensors, which had sleep programs to help induce sleep, and had light and sound programs to gently wake the user. A home monitoring system known as Withings Home was discontinued in 2017.

== Research ==
=== Summary ===
Withings Health Solutions is involved in connected health through a combination of in-house research and academic partnerships. Using real-time data, it tracks the extent to which key risk factors for heart disease are linked to lifestyle, such as sedentary behavior, overweight and obesity, and high blood pressure, and what steps can be taken to reduce risks. Withings products have been involved in numerous clinical trials.

=== Biomarkers ===
References within the table are associated to the metric/biomarkers and not the device model. For example, if Withings validate the pulse wave velocity metric it will be available and validated for all devices that use this metric. Also, Withings can sell sub-models such as the Scanwatch Light which is a derivative of the Scanwatch 2.

Device	Type	Biomarkers	Release	References
Body Scan	scale	Electrochemical skin conductance (ESC), pulse wave velocity (PWV), 6-lead electrocardiography, weight, segmental (upper and lower body) body composition (fat, bone, muscle, visceral fat and water mass), standing heart rate	2022	
Body Comp	scale	Electrochemical skin conductance (ESC), pulse wave velocity (PWV), weight, body composition (fat, bone, muscle, visceral fat and water mass), standing heart rate	2022	
Body Smart	scale	Weight, body composition (fat, bone, muscle, visceral fat and water mass), standing heart rate	2023	
Sleep analyzer	sleep tracker	Total sleep time, time to bedin and bedout, time to sleep and time to wake-up, time in bed, light/deep/REM sleep duration, nightly heart rate, heart rate variability, nightly respiratory rate, AHI, snoring, sleep interruption	2019	
Beamo	Tricorder	1-lead electrocardiography, oxygen saturation, temperature, digital stethoscope	2025	
Uscan	urine analyzer	Various chemical biomarkers (cartridge dependant)	2025	
Scanwatch 2	watch	1-lead electrocardiography, oxygen saturation, skin temperature (at wrist), total sleep time, time to sleep and time to wake up, light/deep sleep duration, nightly heart rate, heart rate variability, activity tracker (steps, type of activity, low/moderate/intense physical activity and calories count), women's cycle (from skin temperature)	2023	
Scanwatch	watch	1-lead electrocardiography, oxygen saturation, total sleep time, time to sleep and time to wake up, light/deep sleep duration, nightly heart rate, heart rate variability, activity tracker (steps, type of activity, low/moderate/intense physical activity and calories count)	2020	

== See also ==
- Connected health
- Quantified Self
