= History of ESPCI Paris =

French science and engineering school

The history of the École supérieure de physique et de chimie industrielles de la ville de Paris (ESPCI ParisTech) began in 1882, driven by concerns among French chemical industry leaders about France's lag behind Germany, particularly after the annexation of Mulhouse following the Franco-Prussian War of 1870. Founded as the École Municipale de Physique et de Chimie Industrielles (EMPCI), later becoming ESPCI, the institution emerged during a period of weakness in French science, largely due to an underdeveloped university system. To counter Germany's economic and industrial strength, particularly in its chemical industry, Alsatian scientists drew inspiration from the German model of integrating higher education and research with industry, exemplified by the laboratories of Justus von Liebig.

The history of ESPCI reflects the close interplay between science and industry in the late 19th and early 20th centuries, followed by a shift toward pure science in the 20th century, free from immediate economic demands. The institution’s evolution can be divided into two phases: an initial focus on industrial and economic needs, followed by a pivot toward fundamental research. Nonetheless, ESPCI has maintained a strong tradition of industry engagement. As Pierre-Gilles de Gennes and his successors emphasized, the school strives to blend cutting-edge fundamental research with practical applications.

ESPCI has been home to notable French scientists, including several Nobel Prize laureates: Pierre Curie, Marie Curie, Pierre-Gilles de Gennes, and Georges Charpak. Its history sheds light on the context of major discoveries, such as the Curies' discovery of radium, and challenges the notion of a stark divide between science and industry.

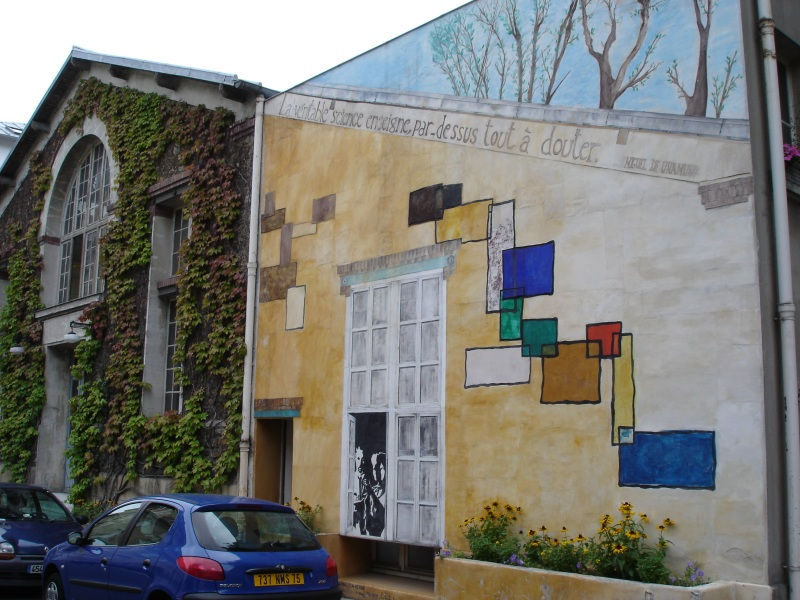
Interior entrance of ESPCI

== Historical context of the establishment ==
=== Institutional context ===
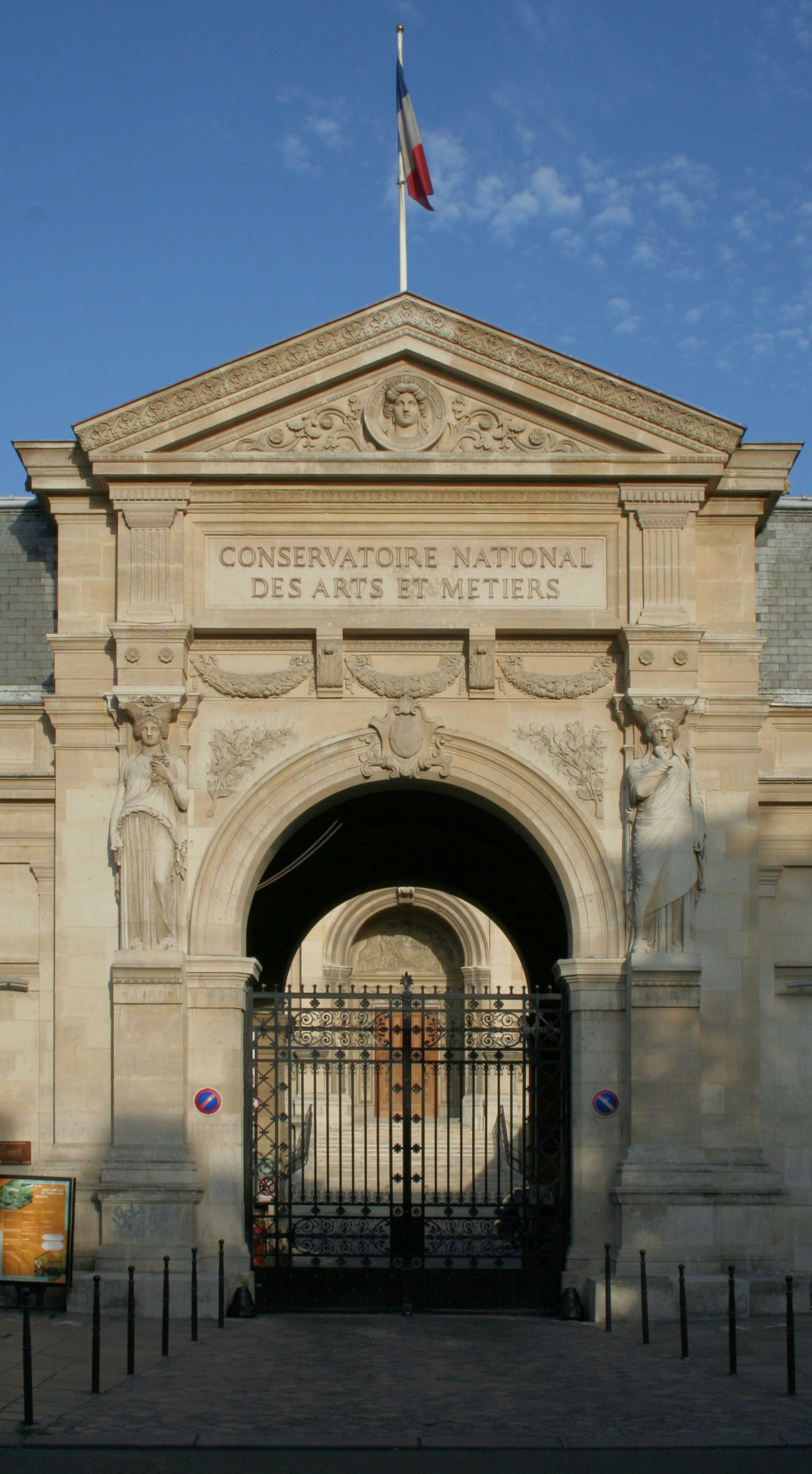
The Conservatoire national des arts et métiers (CNAM), one of France's earliest research institutions.

The establishment of ESPCI was part of a broader effort to structure French higher education in the 19th century, initiated during the revolutionary period with the abolition of universities by the National Convention, and the creation of institutions like the Conservatoire national des arts et métiers (CNAM), École Polytechnique, and École normale supérieure. Located initially at 42 rue Lhomond, ESPCI was founded to address the chemical industry’s needs, which the shortcomings of the 1870s French higher education system failed to meet. This gap threatened France’s economic development amid Europe’s race toward industrialization, particularly in competition with Germany.

French higher education in the 19th century was distinct from its European counterparts due to its dual structure: relatively inactive university faculties until 1870, and specialized institutions like the grandes écoles and research bodies such as the Collège de France and French Academy of Sciences. As historian Antoine Prost notes, true scientific education was provided at institutions like École Polytechnique, the Muséum national d'histoire naturelle, or the Collège de France, rather than in university faculties. These faculties, established by an 1808 decree, primarily focused on administering the baccalauréat, with little emphasis on research.

Scientific and technical education was delivered through a diverse array of grandes écoles, some predating the French Revolution, such as the École nationale des ponts et chaussées (1747) and the École des Mines (1783). Post-1789 institutions included École spéciale militaire de Saint-Cyr (1802), École centrale Paris (1829), and various Écoles nationales supérieures d'arts et métiers. The core of French scientific training, however, rested with École Polytechnique and École normale supérieure, both founded in 1794.

Under Charles Dupin’s influence, the CNAM offered free public education in applied sciences, including mechanics, chemistry for industrial applications, and industrial economics, as mandated by an 1819 ordinance. In industrial regions like Amiens, Lille, Lyon, Mulhouse, and Rouen, learned societies provided evening courses in mechanics and industrial chemistry, led by figures like Jean Girardin and Frédéric Kuhlmann.

The École nationale supérieure de chimie de Mulhouse, established in 1822 to train personnel for chemical processes, was a rare institution specializing in industrial chemistry until its annexation by Germany in 1871, prompting Alsatian refugees in Paris to advocate for a similar school in the capital.

=== Economic and industrial context ===
==== The Second Industrial Revolution ====
ESPCI’s creation coincided with the rise of organic chemistry, a key driver of the Second Industrial Revolution in the late 19th century, alongside advancements in electricity and turbine technology. This period saw a growing alignment between science and industry, particularly in organic chemistry, which was revolutionized by William Henry Perkin’s accidental discovery of mauveine in 1856. This breakthrough spurred the development of synthetic chemistry, replacing natural products with synthetic alternatives, driven by rational applications of atomic theory and molecular representations.

==== Challenges in French Science and Chemistry ====
During this era of technological and scientific progress, French research faced significant challenges. Antoine Prost highlights the dire state of French science: libraries were underfunded, with the Paris law faculty receiving only 1,000 francs annually, and provincial science faculties limited to 1,800 francs for heating, lighting, and laboratories. No laboratories existed at the Paris Faculty of Sciences or the Museum. Research was further hampered by excessive centralization.

French chemistry struggled with the slow adoption of atomism. Albin Haller, in a report for the Exposition Universelle (1900), noted the resistance to atomic theory in France, which hindered progress in organic chemistry. The outdated "system of equivalents," championed by Marcellin Berthelot, persisted in French education until the late 19th century.

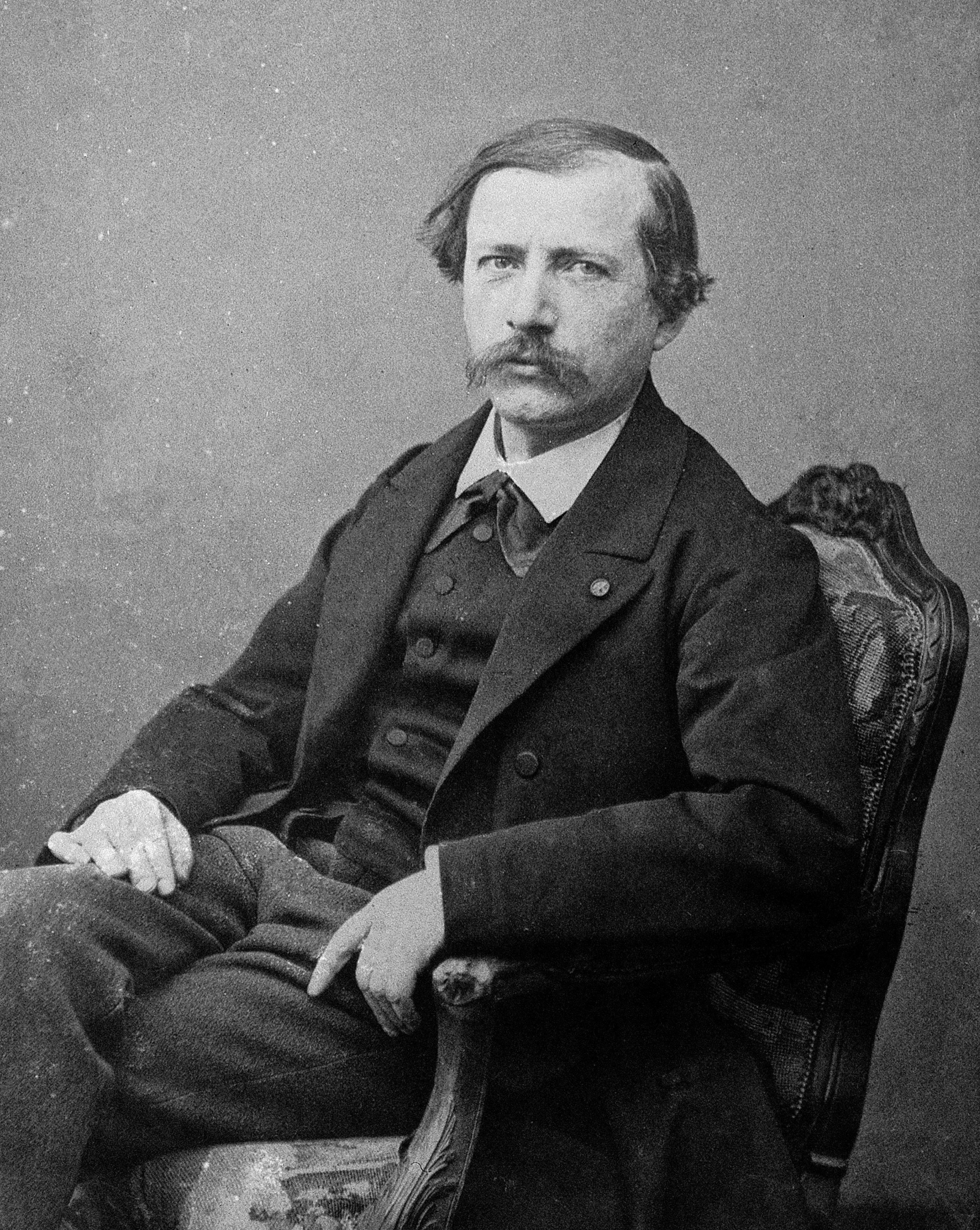
Marcellin Berthelot, who delayed the adoption of atomism in France.

The French higher education system, disconnected from cutting-edge research, failed to meet the needs of emerging industries like chemistry and electricity, which required skilled engineers and technicians. While faculties provided outdated academic knowledge, grandes écoles adhered to a model suited to the First Industrial Revolution, focusing on mathematics and mechanics but neglecting chemistry. Chemistry education was often undervalued, with terms like "chemist" used derogatorily at institutions like École centrale Paris.

==== Insufficient reforms ====
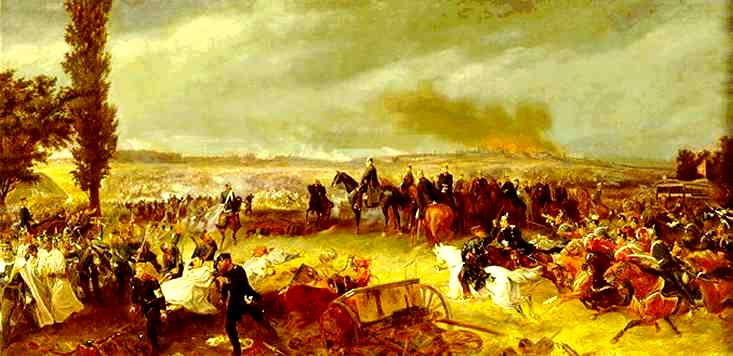
The Prussian victory at Sadowa, cited by Ernest Renan as evidence of German scientific superiority.

Prominent scientists like Louis Pasteur, Marcellin Berthelot, Claude Bernard, and Ernest Renan decried the state of French science in the 1850s and 1860s. Renan, in 1867, attributed Prussia’s victory at Sadowa to German scientific prowess, contrasting it with French deficiencies. Reforms began in the 1870s, with the law of July 12, 1875, allowing independent higher education institutions, and increased funding for faculties between 1875 and 1885. The decree of July 25, 1885, granted faculties greater autonomy and the ability to receive donations.

However, these measures fell short, particularly in chemistry, where the loss of Mulhouse’s chemistry school to Germany left a critical gap. The Paris Universal Exposition of 1878 highlighted France’s industrial lag, prompting Charles Lauth to propose the creation of a National Chemistry School in a report to the Minister of Commerce and Agriculture, laying the groundwork for ESPCI’s establishment.

== Establishment of the school ==
=== Influence of the Alsatian network and the German model ===
The authorship of Charles Lauth’s 1878 proposal was no coincidence. As a prominent member of the Association française pour l'avancement des sciences (AFAS), alongside Charles Adolphe Wurtz, Charles Friedel, Albin Haller, and Paul Schützenberger, Lauth shared a vision of science, its practice, and its relationship with industry, inspired by the German model. These five scientists formed the core of what historians Danielle Fauque and Georges Bram term the "Alsatian network."

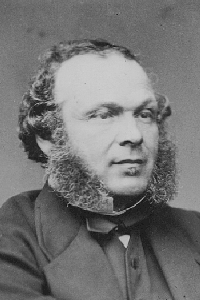
Charles Adolphe Wurtz, a key figure in the Alsatian network

This group promoted the German model, credited for the success of the world’s leading chemical industry at the time, through the AFAS, which Wurtz and Friedel helped found. The AFAS’s annual congresses, held in different cities, effectively disseminated their ideas. For Lauth and his colleagues, Germany’s industrial success stemmed from strong ties between businesses, research, and education. Germany boasted a robust network of autonomous, well-funded universities offering high-level, accessible education. Professors were numerous, well-compensated, and respected, and applied sciences were embraced. Additionally, Germany’s technical schools, nearly all equipped with chemistry laboratories by 1892, trained the engineers the industry needed. The German system’s effectiveness was proven by Justus von Liebig, who, from 1825, emphasized precise laboratory techniques at his Giessen laboratory, a model for German universities and technical institutes led by his former students.

Key features of the German model—decentralization, well-funded universities, accessible education, pragmatism, and a focus on applied research—were absent in France, to the dismay of the Alsatian network.

=== Charles Lauth’s proposal for a national school ===
By 1878, when Lauth wrote to the Minister of Commerce and Agriculture, French higher education reforms were underway. Lauth’s proposal emphasized the need for research and teaching laboratories to train students in “living” chemistry and an education system focused on industrial applications. He envisioned an autonomous chemistry school, a model already well-established.

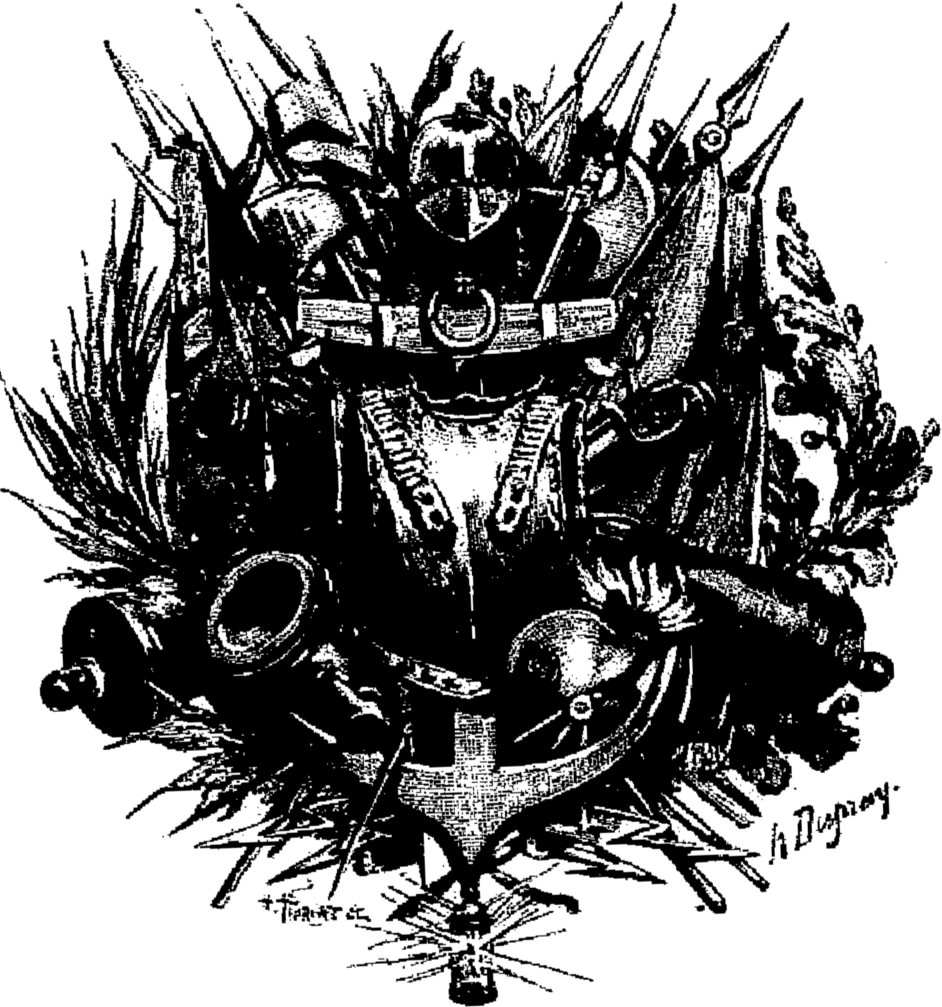
The École Polytechnique, whose emblem from the period is shown, reportedly opposed the creation of ESPCI.

Lauth’s proposed curriculum spanned three years, combining theoretical lectures with practical laboratory work. The first year would cover qualitative and quantitative mineral analysis and basic preparations, with lectures on inorganic and organic chemistry. The second year would focus on organic analysis, industrial analyses, and complex preparations, with lectures on major chemical industries. The third year would train students to solve industrial problems through methodical projects, with lectures highlighting the latest scientific and industrial advancements. Graduates would earn a special “chemical engineer” diploma after an examination or competition. This approach, supported by figures like Louis Pasteur and Marcellin Berthelot, aimed to avoid the excessive abstraction of institutions like École Polytechnique and the rudimentary empiricism of schools like the École nationale supérieure d'arts et métiers. It emphasized experimental science and laboratory work to produce skilled chemical engineers capable of addressing the challenges of the emerging chemical industry.

However, Lauth’s national school proposal was not realized, reportedly due to resistance from grandes écoles and Parisian academics offended by his critiques.

=== Creation of the Municipal School in Paris ===
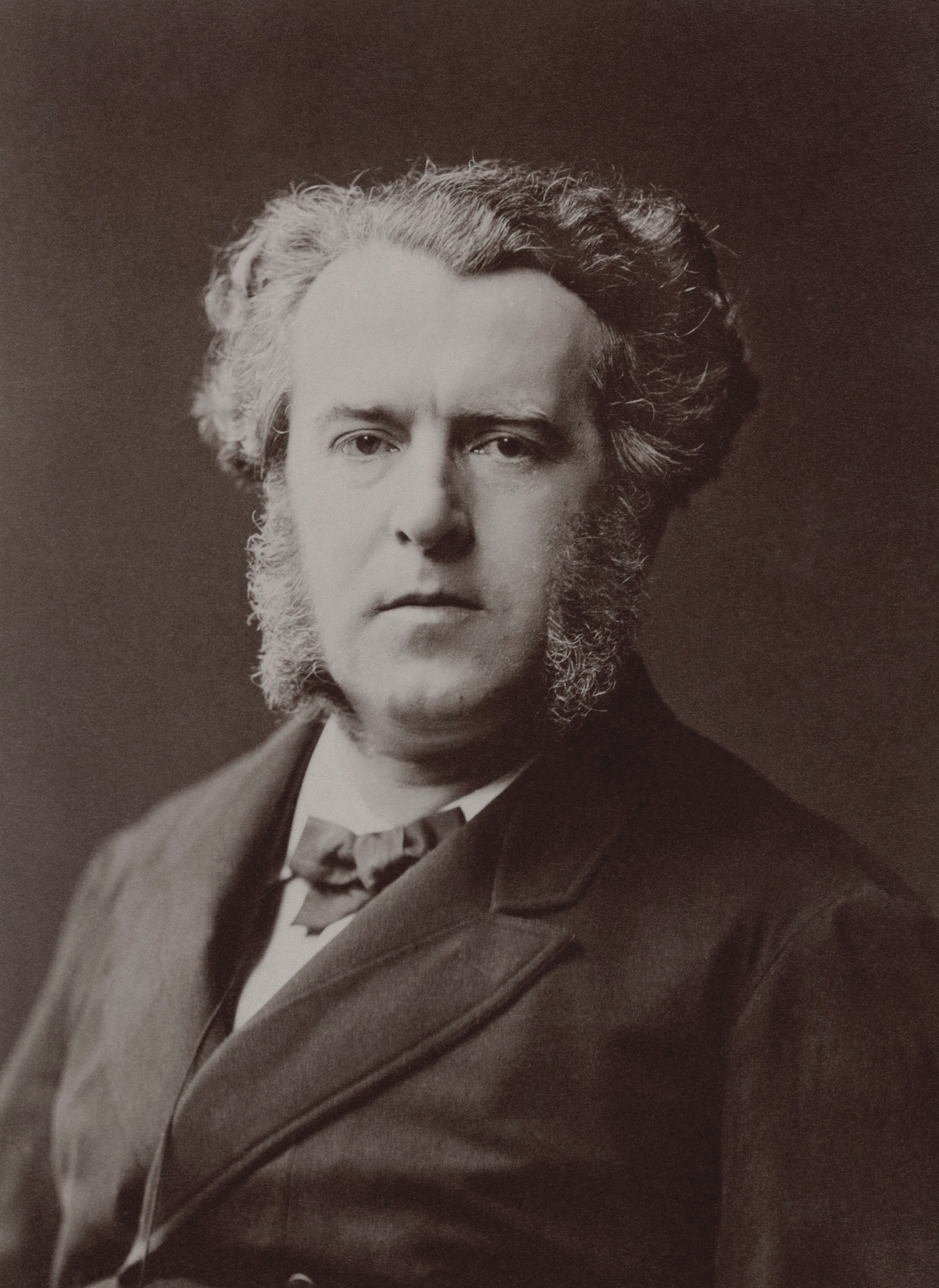
The École Municipale de Physique et de Chimie Industrielle, later ESPCI, was formally established by Charles Floquet.

Undeterred, Lauth turned to the Paris Municipal Council, where he served. On December 22, 1880, the council prioritized the school’s creation, allocating 10,000 francs for a feasibility study and forming a commission. On June 20, 1881, the Prefect of the Seine appointed 14 commission members, including Berthelot, Wurtz, and Lauth (as director of the Sèvres manufactory). The commission’s report, presented months later, outlined the school’s entrance requirements, internal regulations, study duration, curriculum, budget, and mission statement. Two innovations stood out: the inclusion of physics alongside chemistry, anticipating their mutual development, particularly in electricity, following the 1881 Paris International Electricity Exposition; and a 50-franc monthly stipend for students to broaden access, echoing the German model’s accessibility.

The report’s mission statement emphasized the school’s goal: to equip students with specialized scientific knowledge for significant roles in industrial settings, such as constructing physics apparatus or conducting industrial chemistry research. Unlike existing higher education institutions, which trained doctors, pharmacists, professors, and scholars, the École Municipale de Physique et de Chimie Industrielle would complement advanced primary education, focusing on practical, specialized training to produce foremen, engineers, or chemists. It drew inspiration from similar schools in Mulhouse, Zurich, and Strasbourg, and referenced Lauth’s 1878 letter advocating for a national chemistry school.

The École Municipale de Physique et de Chimie Industrielle was formally established by an ordinance signed by Prefect Charles Floquet on August 28, 1882.

== Two major periods of the school ==
The history of ESPCI, particularly its relationship with industry and research, can be divided into two distinct periods. The first, lasting until the late 1920s under Paul Langevin’s directorship, was marked by a strong industrial focus. The second, beginning in the early 1930s, saw a significant shift toward fundamental sciences and research.

=== 1882–1930: A school in service of the industry ===
==== Influence of the Alsatian network ====
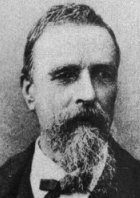
Paul Schützenberger, the first director of the future ESPCI

The first three directors—Paul Schützenberger, Charles Lauth, and Albin Haller—were instrumental in the school’s founding, alongside Charles Friedel, an early board member, and Charles Adolphe Wurtz, who served on the municipal council’s study commission. The École Municipale de Physique et de Chimie Industrielle (EMPCI), later ESPCI, was deeply shaped by the ideas of the Alsatian network, comprising these five scientists.

The school adopted the pragmatic German model championed by the Alsatian network, emphasizing practical and experimental training. The EMPCI curriculum allocated only a quarter of its time to theoretical courses, with the rest dedicated to industrially relevant activities: laboratory work, technical drawing, and technological problem-solving, with minimal lectures. Third-year students were introduced to industrial accounting, basic political economy, and discussions on manufacturing processes and industry needs. This reflected a strong commitment to industrial integration.

The institution maintained close ties with industry. Industrialists comprised nearly one-sixth of the board, ensuring alignment with industrial strategies by assigning some courses to scientists employed in industry. Faculty members also engaged directly in industrial projects: Schützenberger contributed to chemical manufacturing, particularly fertilizers and synthetic dyes; Lauth collaborated with the Saint-Denis chemical company’s research and production teams; and Haller consulted extensively with Parisian industrialists.

The student profile further reinforced the school’s industrial focus. Admission targeted graduates of advanced primary schools, equipped with practical skills in science and mathematics and inclined toward industrial careers, unlike lycée students, who showed little interest in technical fields, or those from basic primary schools, whose education was insufficient.

==== Neglect of scientific research ====
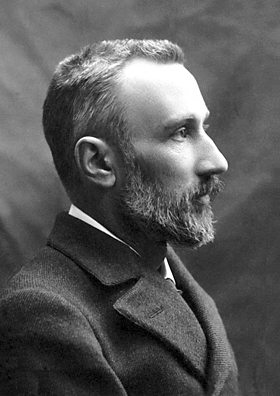
Pierre Curie, a preparator at EMPCI, was bound by rules discouraging personal research to focus on supervising students.

Despite the Alsatian network’s influence, the EMPCI diverged from Lauth’s original vision. Lauth criticized Parisian laboratories as inadequate for students seeking to learn, lacking proper guidance to translate scientific discoveries into practical outcomes or spark new industries. His proposed third-year curriculum aimed to train students in solving industrial problems while keeping them updated on scientific and industrial advancements. However, the EMPCI’s early curriculum prioritized technology over pure science, omitting the latest scientific developments, particularly in the third year, which focused on industrial accounting and economic discussions.

Research, even applied, was absent from the curriculum, with no time allocated for it. Regulations discouraged personal research by preparators, requiring them to dedicate their time to supervising students in laboratories, where third-year students spent most of their day. Despite this, exceptions were made, notably allowing Pierre Curie to research piezoelectricity.

==== Balancing Science and Industry ====
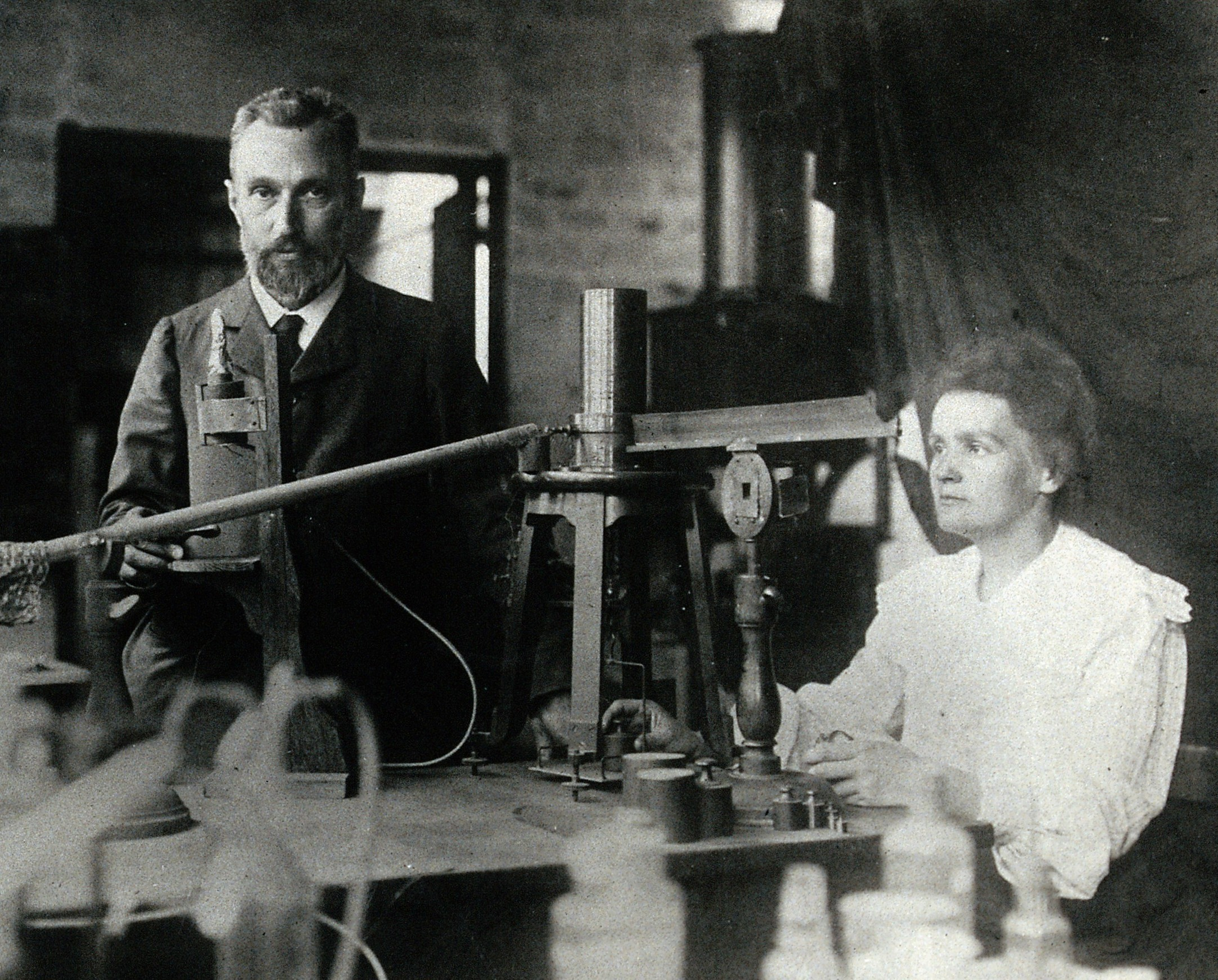
Pierre Curie and Marie Curie in their EMPCI laboratory

The early directors sought to balance the school’s industrial mission with scientific research, though this was challenging. On November 5, 1906, Haller proposed hosting foreign researchers to enhance the school’s reputation, citing the international renown of its faculty. Lauth, then a board member, opposed this, arguing that the school’s industrial focus should not shift toward pure science, as hosting foreign researchers could compromise its purpose.

Schützenberger also championed fundamental research. Paul Langevin noted that without Schützenberger’s and his successors’ support, Pierre Curie might not have completed his groundbreaking thesis on magnetism or discovered radium, potentially leaving the school. A 1903 evaluation of Curie acknowledged his tendency toward pure science but valued his contributions to the school’s prestige.

This balancing act enabled high-level research, notably by Pierre and Marie Curie, but resources were limited. Terry Shinn notes that Pierre Curie, a mere lecturer, conducted his research in a dilapidated shed with outdated equipment.

=== From 1930: Embracing research ===
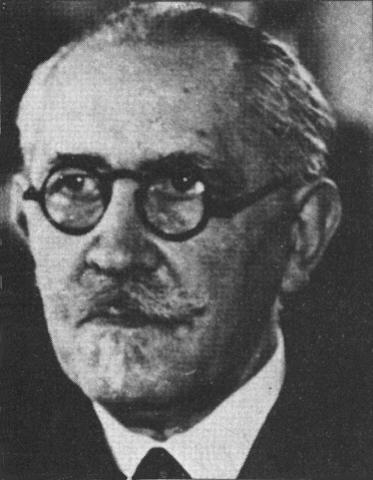
Paul Langevin, a former student of Pierre Curie, directed ESPCI from 1925 to 1946.

It was not until the early 1930s, under the leadership of Paul Langevin, that ESPCI began to fully embrace fundamental research and pure science.

==== Nature of the changes ====
Terry Shinn identifies four key changes to the curriculum: a) applied mathematics courses were replaced by advanced theoretical mathematics; b) technological training was partially overshadowed by theoretical sciences and the interplay between theory and experimental discoveries; c) specialized studies supplanted multidisciplinarity; and d) research became an integral part of the curriculum. The proportion of practical training decreased from 74% to 65% of study time, while theoretical instruction expanded. Concurrently, fundamental research gained prominence, exemplified by René Lucas’s work on birefringence and Georges Champetier’s contributions to molecular chemistry. ESPCI became a hub for discussing and refining bold concepts from Louis de Broglie and showcasing discoveries by Frédéric Joliot-Curie. Between 1953 and 1970, the number of active researchers at ESPCI grew from 37 to 116. A 1971 report emphasized that “research is inseparable from true higher education. How can one teach the science being created without participating in its creation?” In 1937, ESPCI relaxed its earlier restrictions, allowing foreign researchers from Luxembourg and Czechoslovakia, limited to 10% of the French student body. Meanwhile, industrial influence waned, with industrialists’ representation on the board halving to 10% between 1950 and 1965.

==== Continued industrial connection ====
The integration of research training, occupying 8% of the curriculum per Shinn’s analysis, and the emphasis on fundamental research marked a return to the principles of the Alsatian network. Yet, ESPCI retained its industrial mission. Industrialists, though fewer, remained on the board, and practical, application-oriented training continued to dominate the curriculum. Even the most fundamental research maintained a focus on practical applications, following the example of the Curies and Langevin, who applied his theoretical work on ultrasonics to invent sonar during World War I.

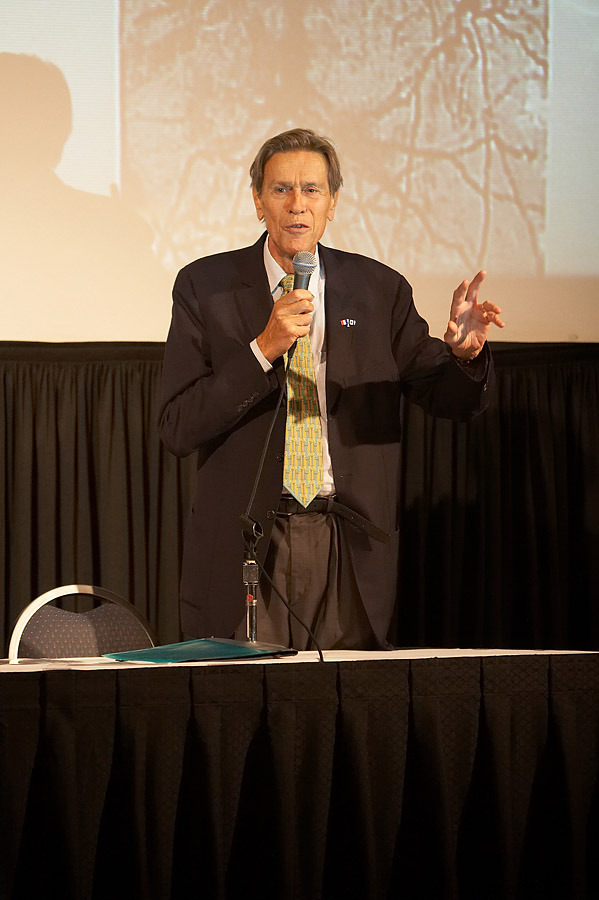
Pierre-Gilles de Gennes continued ESPCI’s tradition of blending fundamental research with industrial applications.

Langevin and his successors rejected any strict divide between pure and applied science. Langevin argued that scientists must connect with society’s needs through engineers and technicians, stating: “The scientist can no longer remain isolated but must be linked to the farmer and the worker, increasingly educated, through a continuous chain of intermediaries and interpreters represented by engineers and technicians at various levels of expertise and roles. The need has become clear to ensure this connection by creating institutions to train individuals not only informed about established science but, above all, immersed in its methods, understanding through direct and sustained experimentation and rigorous laboratory training how science is created, its provisional and living nature, and the degree of confidence its results warrant, too often taught dogmatically, definitively, and lifelessly.” This ethos was deepened by successors like Pierre-Gilles de Gennes.

=== The school today ===
Under Pierre-Gilles de Gennes, ESPCI achieved its current balance, becoming one of France’s top engineering schools. De Gennes encouraged faculty to bridge science and industry, emphasizing the potential applications of even the most fundamental research.

During his tenure, ESPCI expanded its fundamental research, hosting 20 laboratories, 18 affiliated with the CNRS, and two interdisciplinary research groups, collectively employing over 250 researchers and 40 foreign visitors. The school awards about 20 doctorates annually.

ESPCI maintains strong industry ties, filing approximately 40 patents yearly. Several companies have emerged from the school. Claude Boccara, scientific director until 2003, noted: “The significant partnerships we maintain with public research entities (Ministry of Research, CNRS, Medical Research Institute) and private sectors (large corporations, small and medium enterprises) give ESPCI a distinctive profile of innovative research, seamlessly spanning the most fundamental aspects to the most strategic applications.”

== Timeline ==
Timeline of ESPCI Paris
Year	Event
1878	Charles Lauth’s letter to the Minister of Commerce (unanswered)
1880	Creation of a chemistry school proposed at the Paris Municipal Council Formation of a commission with a 10,000-franc budget Pierre Curie and Jacques Curie begin work on crystal electrical properties, leading to the discovery of piezoelectricity
1881	Appointment of commission members Presentation of the commission’s report
1882	Ordinance establishes the school Director: Paul Schützenberger Creation of the advisory and administrative board First entrance exam: 33 candidates First academic year: 29 students
1897	Paul Schützenberger falls ill; interim director: Gariel Marie Curie begins research on uranium radiation
1898	Discovery of polonium Discovery of radium
1899	Director: Charles Lauth Director of Studies (new position): Charles Gariel
1903	Nobel Prize in Physics awarded to Pierre Curie and Marie Curie
1905	Director: Albin Haller Director of Studies: Paul Langevin
1906	Introduction of physical chemistry to the curriculum
1911	Nobel Prize in Chemistry awarded to Marie Curie
1925	Director: Paul Langevin Director of Studies: Hippolyte Copaux
1927	Curriculum revisions
1935	Nobel Prize in Chemistry awarded to Frédéric Joliot-Curie and Irène Joliot-Curie
1940	Director: André-Louis Debierne Director of Studies: René Lucas
1946	Death of Paul Langevin
1947	Director: René Lucas Director of Studies: Georges Champetier
1948	Study duration extended to four years Name change: École Municipale (EMPCI) becomes École Supérieure de Physique et de Chimie Industrielle (ESPCI)
1969	Director: Georges Champetier Director of Studies: Jean Uebersfeld Scientific Director (new position): Jacques Badoz
1973	Curriculum reform plan
1976	Director: Pierre-Gilles de Gennes Director of Studies: Lucien Monnerie Scientific Director: Jacques Lewiner
1991	Nobel Prize in Physics awarded to Pierre-Gilles de Gennes
1992	Nobel Prize in Physics awarded to Georges Charpak
2003	Director: Jacques Prost Director of Studies: Françoise Lafuma Scientific Director: Claude Boccara
2008	Name change: ESPCI becomes ESPCI ParisTech
2009	Director of Studies: Marc Fermigier Scientific Director: François Lequeux
2014	Director: Jean-François Joanny Director of Studies: Élisabeth Bouchaud Scientific Director: Jérôme Lesueur
2016	Brand name change: ESPCI ParisTech becomes ESPCI Paris Director of Studies: Véronique Bellosta Research Director: Rémi Carminati
2019	Director General: Vincent Croquette Director of Studies: Nicolas Lequeux Research Director: Costantino Creton

== See also ==
- École supérieure de physique et de chimie industrielles de la ville de Paris
- Pierre Curie and Marie Curie
- Paul Langevin
- Pierre-Gilles de Gennes
- Georges Charpak
- Charles Adolphe Wurtz
- Charles Lauth
- Albin Haller
- Paul Schützenberger
- Charles Friedel
- Frédéric Joliot-Curie and Irène Joliot-Curie
- Justus von Liebig
- Second Industrial Revolution
- Organic chemistry

== Bibliography ==
- Bensaude-Vincent, Bernadette (1987). Langevin: 1872-1946 ; science et vigilance [Langevin: 1872-1946; Science and Vigilance] (in French). Paris: Belin. ISBN 978-2-7011-0873-5.
- Biquard, Pierre (1982). Du radium au microprocesseur. Histoire de l'École Supérieure de Physique et de Chimie 1882-1982 [From Radium to the Microprocessor: History of the École Supérieure de Physique et de Chimie 1882-1982] (in French). Paris: Institut pour le Développement de la Science et de la Technologie. p. 169. ISBN 978-2903667016.
- Boudia, Soraya (1997). Marie Curie et son laboratoire : science, industrie, instruments et métrologie de la radioactivité en France. 1896-1941 [Marie Curie and Her Laboratory: Science, Industry, Instruments, and Metrology of Radioactivity in France, 1896-1941] (PhD dissertation). Université Paris VII - Denis Diderot.
- Fauque, Danielle; Bram, Georges (1994). "Le réseau alsacien" [The Alsatian Network]. Bulletin de la société industrielle de Mulhouse (in French). 833: 17–20.
- Grelon, André (1989). "Les universités et la formation des ingénieurs en France (1870-1914)" [Universities and the Training of Engineers in France (1870-1914)]. Formation Emploi (in French). 27–28: 65–88. doi:10.3406/forem.1989.1354.
- Grossetti, Michel (1996). Science, industrie et territoire [Science, Industry, and Territory] (in French). Toulouse: Presses Universitaires du Mirail. p. 312. doi:10.4000/books.pumi.13572. ISBN 978-2-85816-255-0.
- Prost, Antoine (1968). Histoire de l'enseignement en France, 1800-1967 [History of Education in France, 1800-1967] (in French). Paris: A. Colin. p. 523. ISBN 9782200310790.
- Ramunni, Girolamo (1995). Les sciences pour l'ingénieur. Histoire du rendez-vous des sciences et de la société [Sciences for the Engineer: History of the Convergence of Science and Society] (in French). Paris: Éditions du CNRS. p. 150. ISBN 9782271053732.
- Shinn, Terry (1981). "Des sciences industrielles aux sciences fondamentales. La mutation de l'École supérieure de physique et de chimie (1882-1970)" [From Industrial Sciences to Fundamental Sciences: The Transformation of the École supérieure de physique et de chimie (1882-1970)]. Revue Française de Sociologie. 22 (2): 167–182. doi:10.2307/3320999. JSTOR 3320999.
