= Dicarbonyldi-μ-chlorodichlorodiplatinum =

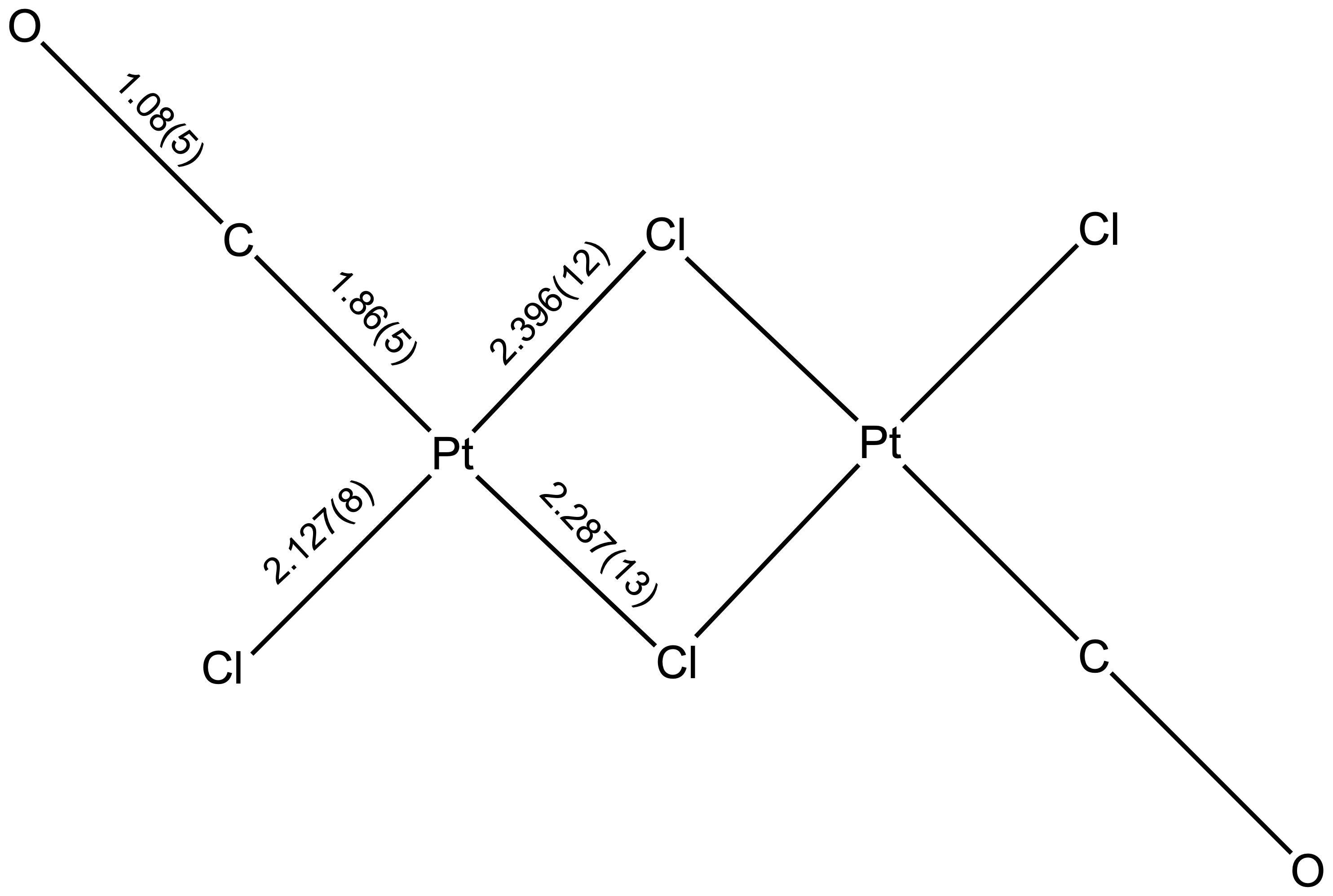

Identifiers
CAS Number	17522-99-5
3D model (JSmol)	Interactive image
ChemSpider	21188226
EC Number	241-519-4241-519-4
PubChem CID	130476784
- InChI: InChI=1S/2CO.4ClH.2Pt/c2*1-2;;;;;;/h;;4*1H;;/q;;;;;;2*+2/p-4; Key: ITTDXEJZAMBOHT-UHFFFAOYSA-J
- SMILES: C(#[O])[Pt+2]1([Cl-])[Cl-][Pt+2](C#[O])([Cl-])[Cl-]1

Properties
Chemical formula	C_{2}Cl_{4}O_{2}Pt_{2}
Molar mass	587.99 g·mol^{−1}
- Except where otherwise noted, data are given for materials in their standard state (at 25 °C [77 °F], 100 kPa). Infobox references

trans-Dicarbonyldi-μ-chlorodichlorodiplatinum is the first ever isolated metal-carbonyl complex. It was first synthesized by Paul Schützenberger in 1868. This discovery of [Pt(CO)Cl_{2}]_{2} opened the door for the exploration of metal-carbonyl complexes and represents a significant breakthrough in the field of organometallic chemistry. Though [Pt(CO)Cl_{2}]_{2} itself is not used in industry, metal carbonyls are an important class of catalysts for a wide range of industrial processes including hydroformylation amongst others. As such, the discovery of [Pt(CO)Cl_{2}]_{2} was an important milestone both in the synthesis of organometallic compounds and in the development of many important catalysts widely used today.

== Structure and characterization ==
Dicarbonyldi-μ-chlorodichlorodiplatinum has both cis and trans isomers. Unless noted otherwise, [Pt(CO)Cl_{2}]_{2} in this article specifically refers to the trans isomer.

=== Crystal structure ===
The crystal structure of [Pt(CO)Cl_{2}]_{2} has been obtained. [Pt(CO)Cl_{2}]_{2} can be roughly thought of as two square planar Pt(CO)Cl_{3} centers, but the complex does not perfectly align with that model; the two platinum centers deviate from the square planar geometry of Pt(Cl)_{3}CO monomers. The μ-chloro ligands and the CO ligand on each Pt center are coplanar, but the terminal Cl on both 2Pt centers is 0.228 Å out of plane, giving the complex overall C_{2} symmetry. Additionally, the bridging chlorines are not equally shared between the two Pt centers.

=== Spectroscopic characterization ===
IR spectroscopy and NMR have also both been used to characterize [Pt(CO)Cl_{2}]_{2}. The CO stretching frequency for [Pt(CO)Cl_{2}]_{2} is 2139 cm^{−1} in DCM (the C-O stretching frequency has also been measured in thionyl chloride, cyclohexane and benzene, toluene and n-heptane). ^{195}Pt NMR reveals two Pt peaks for [Pt(CO)Cl_{2}]_{2} (at 1507 and 1511 ppm) in thionyl chloride. This is believed to be due to the formation of two distinct Pt dimers in solution (where solvation effects cause slight changes in Pt chemical shift) or stacking of dimers in solution giving rise to distinct Pt shifts. ^{13}C NMR reveals a 139.9 shift for the carbonyl carbons with a ^{195}Pt ^{13}C coupling constant of 1958.8 Hz.

== Synthesis ==
=== Schützenberger's discovery of [Pt(CO)Cl_{2}]_{2} ===
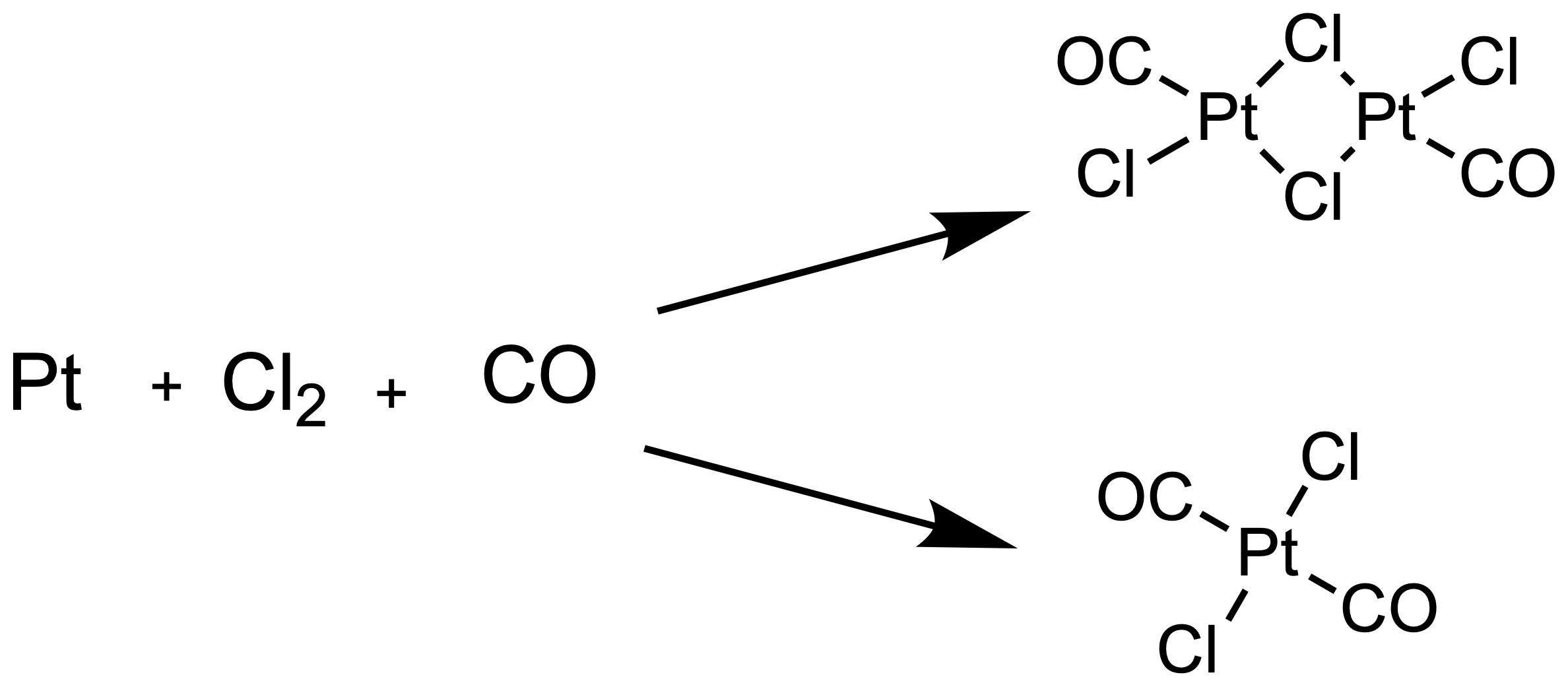
Compounds synthesized by Schutzenberger from Pt sponge, Cl_{2} and CO. [PtCl_{2}(CO)]_{2} is favored at high temperatures

Schützenberger first synthesized [Pt(CO)Cl_{2}]_{2} in 1868. The complex was sourced from Pt black and CO and Cl_{2} gases, but there are conflicting reports on whether he flowed a mixture of the gasses over platinum black or first formed PtCl_{2} and subsequently exposed the compound to CO. However, Schützenberger's isolated product is consistently reported to be a volatile yellow solid. Schützenberger also observed that performing the reaction at different temperatures yields compounds with different melting points. Based on this observation, Schützenberger identified that the composition of the platinum complex formed under these conditions is determined by the temperature at which the reaction proceeds. Pt(CO)_{2}Cl_{2} is formed at a narrow temperature range with this procedure, but the diplatinum complex (and liberation of two CO equivalents) is favored at higher temperatures.

=== More recent syntheses ===
More recently, [Pt(CO)Cl_{2}]_{2} has been accessed from other platinum complexes. Dell'Amico et al. reported the formation of [Pt(CO)Cl_{2}]_{2} from the dimerization of trans-[PtCl_{2}(NCEt)(CO)] with the production of 2 equivalents of EtCN as a byproduct. To obtain [Pt(CO)Cl_{2}]_{2}, cis-[PtCl_{2}(NCEt)(CO)] is dissolved in dry mesitylene. The solution is then heated, allowing the solvent to evaporate. ^{195}Pt NMR analysis of the resulting solid reveals a mixture of trans-[PtCl_{2}(NCEt)(CO)] and [Pt(CO)Cl_{2}]_{2}. Repeating this dissolution/evaporation procedure yields an orange residue showing complete conversion to [Pt(CO)Cl_{2}]_{2}.

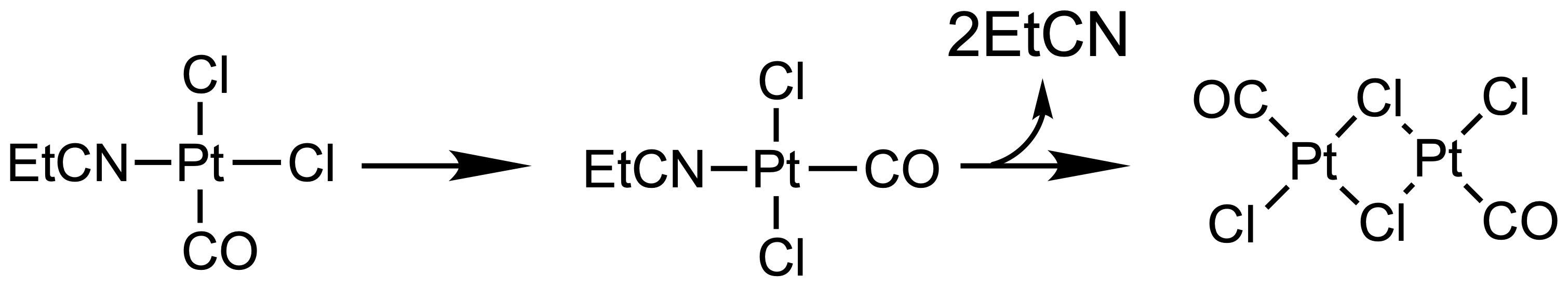
Synthesis of [Pt(CO)Cl_{2}]_{2} from Pt(CO)(NCEt)Cl_{2}.

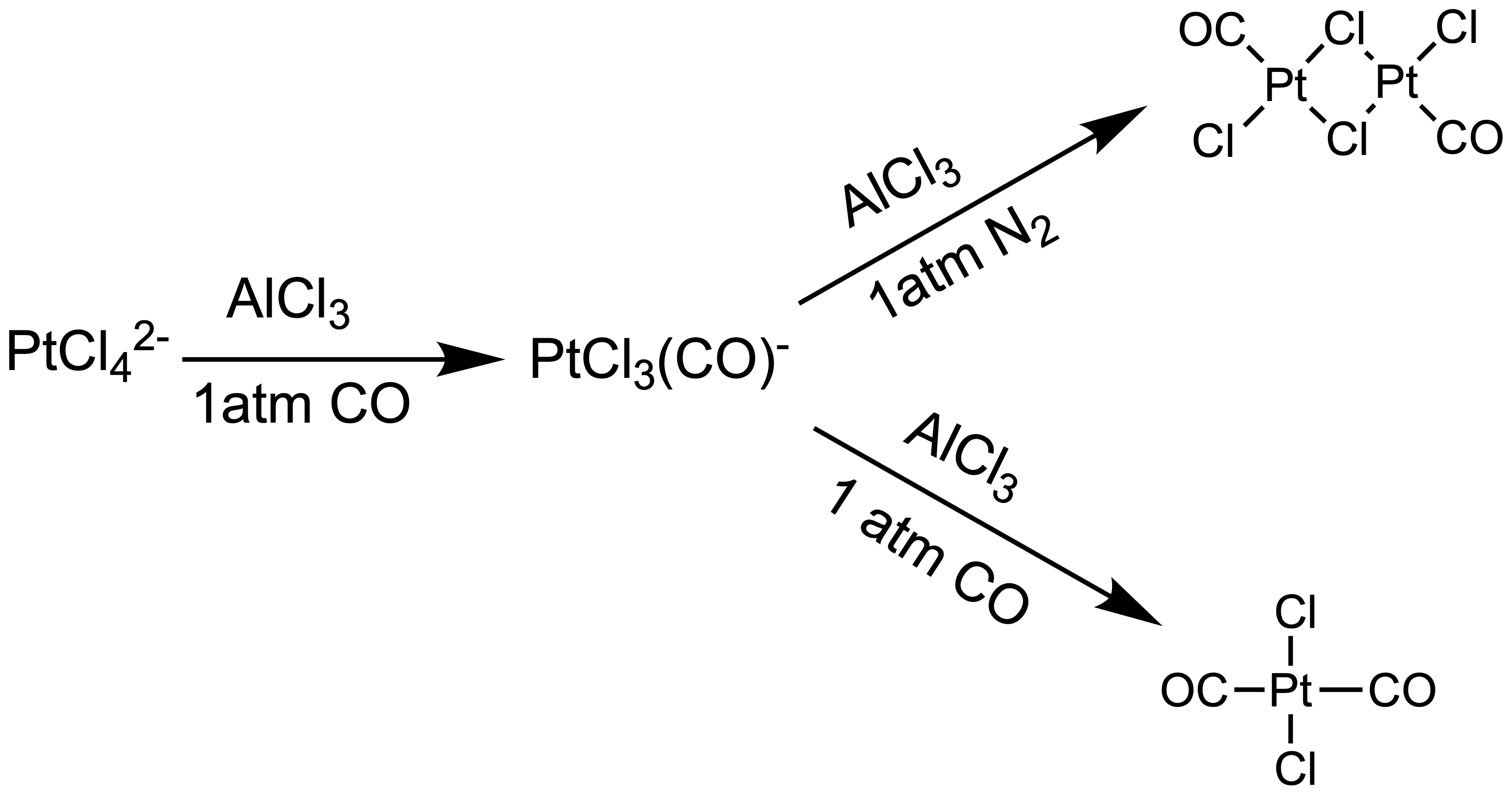
Solution phase synthesis of [Pt(CO)Cl_{2}]_{2} from PtCl^{2−}_{4}.

Alternatively,[Pt(CO)Cl_{2}]_{2} has been prepared from

Pt(CO)Cl^{−}_{3}. Pt(CO)Cl^{−}_{3} can be generated in chlorinated solvents by treating PtCl^{2−}_{4} with AlCl_{3} under a CO atmosphere. Pt(CO)Cl^{−}_{3} can also be accessed by allowing PtCl^{2−}_{4} to equilibrate under a CO atmosphere at room temperature, but this equilibration occurs over the course of approximately 40 hours. [Pt(CO)Cl_{2}]_{2} can then be generated from Pt(CO)Cl^{−}_{3} by treatment with AlCl_{3} under a nitrogen atmosphere. Interestingly, treating Pt(CO)Cl^{−}_{3} with AlCl_{3} under a CO atmosphere, trans-Pt(CO)_{2}Cl_{2} is formed instead.

== Reactivity ==
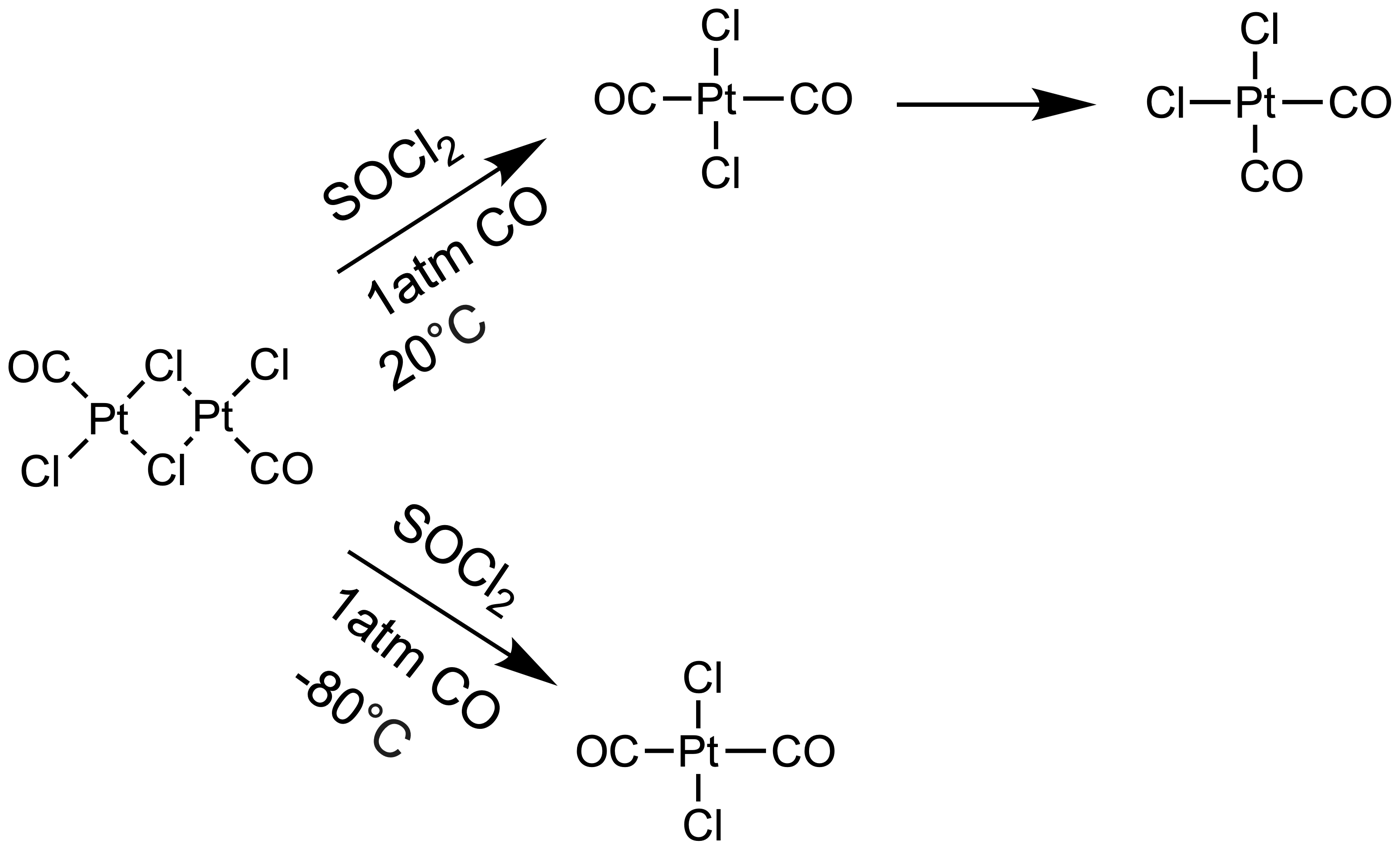
Dissociation of [Pt(CO)Cl_{2}]_{2} into Pt(CO)_{2}Cl_{2}.

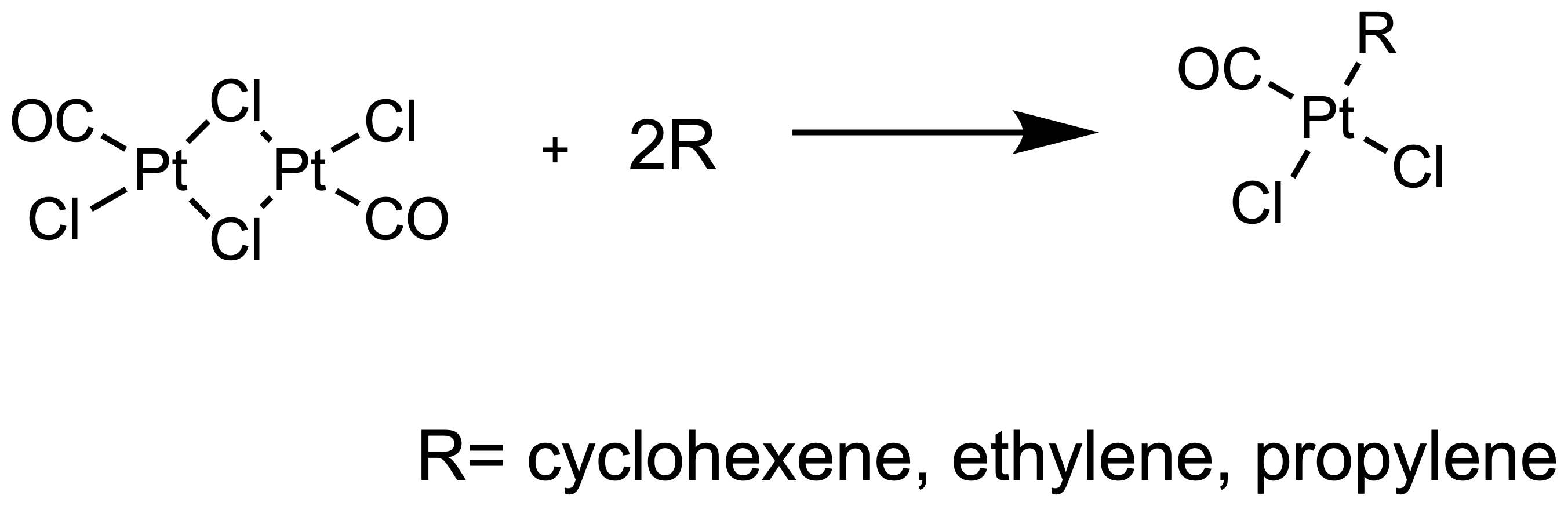
Olefin addition to [PtCl_{2}(CO)]_{2}.

[Pt(CO)Cl_{2}]_{2} can dissociate into mono-platinum complexes. By dissolving [Pt(CO)Cl_{2}]_{2} in thionyl chloride and exposing the solution to atmospheric pressure of CO at room temperature, Pt(CO)_{2}Cl_{2} is formed. Interestingly, trans-Pt(CO)_{2}Cl_{2} is observed shortly after exposure to CO, but after allowing the reaction to proceed for 24 hours, the cis isomer is exclusively observed. Trans-Pt(CO)_{2}Cl_{2} can also be isolated from [Pt(CO)Cl_{2}]_{2} by performing the reaction at -80 °C. This reaction is observed to be complete after 10 hours. Trans-Pt(CO)_{2}Cl_{2} is stable at -80 °C, but rapidly converts to the cis isomer at room temperature. Alternatively, olefin substitution can cause the dissociation of the diplatinum complex. [Pt(CO)Cl_{2}]_{2} and an olefin (cyclohexene, ethylene or propylene) can be combined in toluene, causing the dissociation of the diplatinum complex to form two equivalents of cis-PtCl_{2}(CO)(olefin).

[Pt(CO)Cl_{2}]_{2} has also been explored as a molecular precursor for loading platinum onto silica (which has been subsequently used to hydrogenate cyclohexene on a laboratory scale). To do so, dry silica is treated with [Pt(CO)Cl_{2}]_{2} in toluene at room temperature under a nitrogen atmosphere. The Pt containing fragments appear to migrate to the surface of the silica based on the orange color of the material after treatment. Authors attribute this color change to adsorption of a Pt center onto the SiO_{2} surface followed by cleavage of the μ-chloro linkages to form surface bound PtCl_{2}(CO) species. The treated SiO_{2} particles were then recovered by filtration and exposed to water vapor at 40 °C to liberate CO_{2} and HCl, leaving metallic Pt loaded on silica.

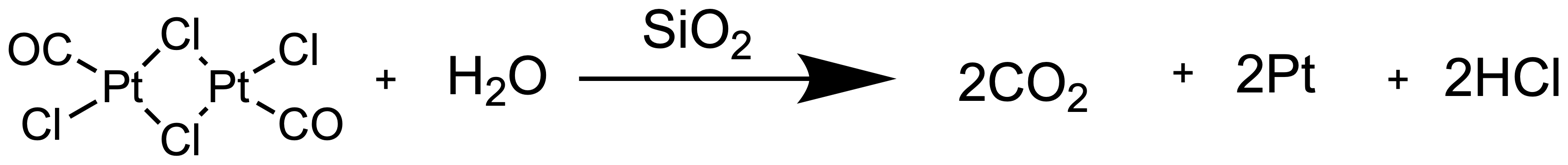
Overall reaction for Pt loading onto silica nanoparticles from [PtCl_{2}(CO)]_{2}.

[Pt(CO)Cl_{2}]_{2} has also been used as a starting material for the formation of more complicated platinum containing complexes. Panuzi et al. report the formation of a diplatinum complex formed by reacting a functionalized xanthene with [Pt(CO)Cl_{2}]_{2} (shown in the figure below). To synthesize the bidentate xanthene ligand, 4,5-dibromo-2,7-di-tert-butyl-9,9-dimethylxanthene and excess CuCN are refluxed in dry quinoline for 24 hours. The resulting solid is then washed with diethyl ether and extracted into chloroform. The solid is then purified on a silica column with a 40:1 DCM:methanol eluent (40% yield). To form the platinum complex, the synthesized ligand is combined with excess [Pt(CO)Cl_{2}]_{2} in toluene. The mixture was allowed to stand overnight at 5 °C, where yellow crystals formed. These crystals were then isolated and washed with dry toluene, yielding the pure diplatinum xanthene complex.

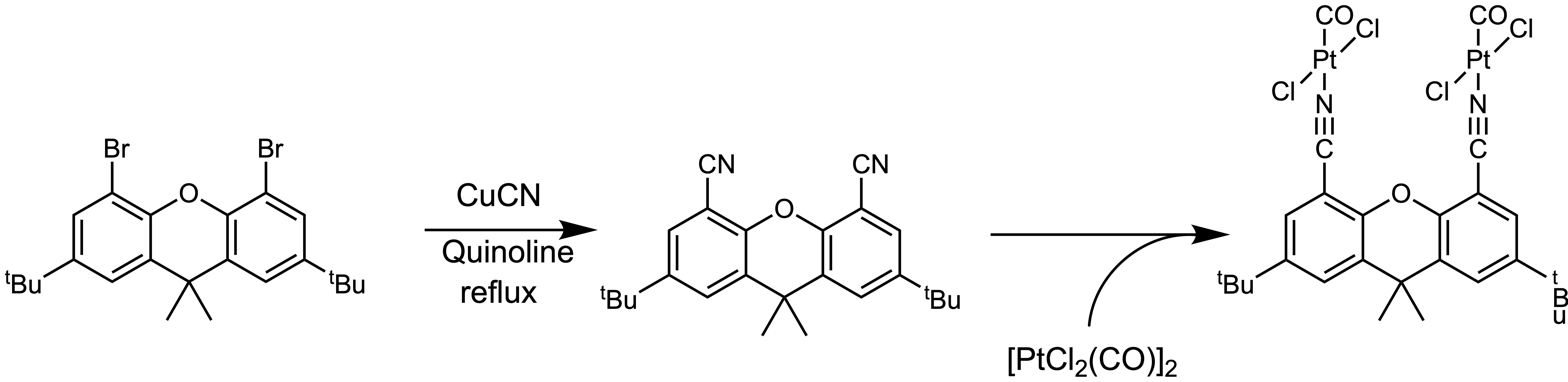
Synthesis of other complexes from [Pt(CO)Cl_{2}]_{2}.

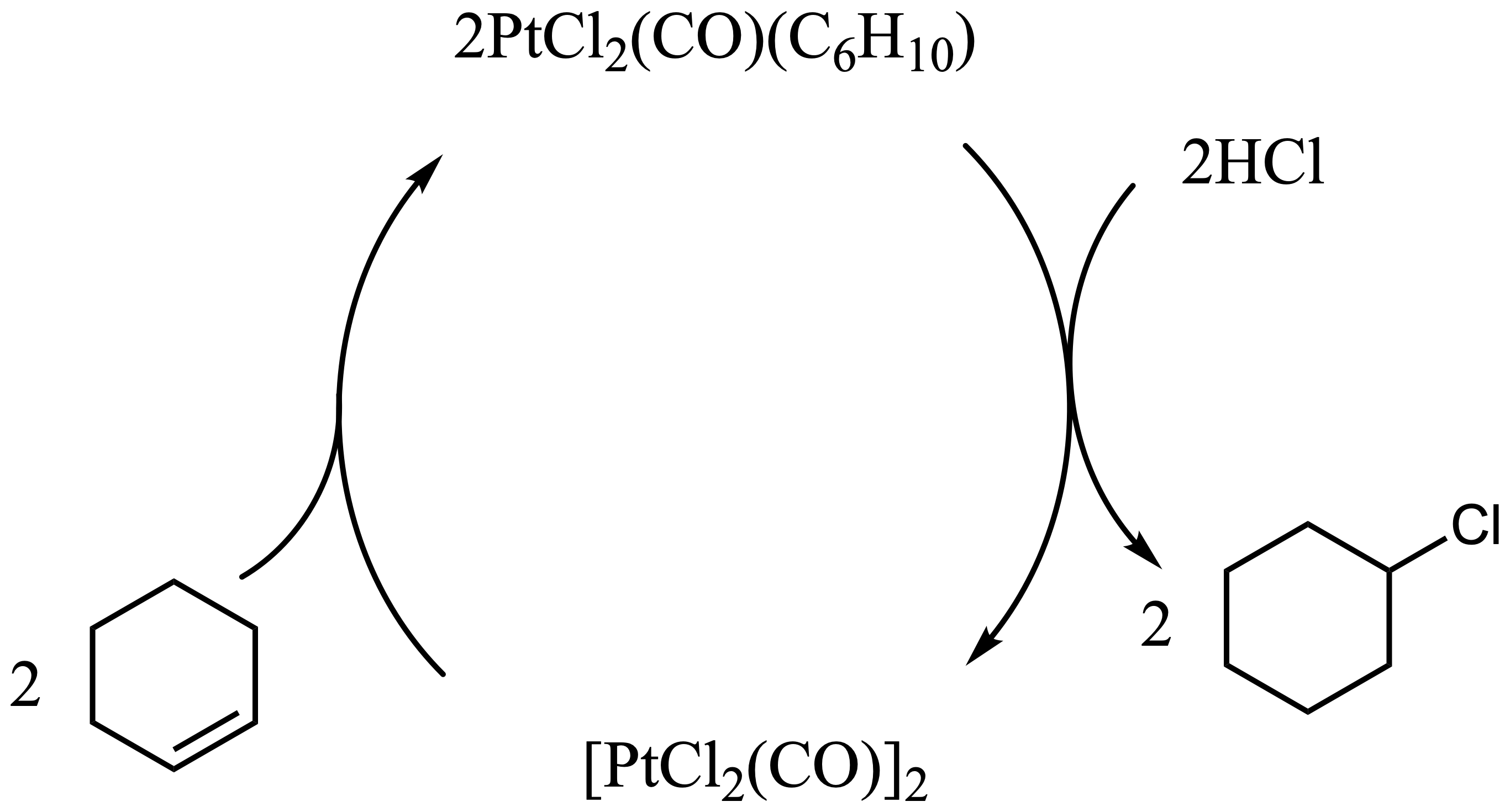
Catalytic hydrochlorination of cyclohexene.

[Pt(CO)Cl_{2}]_{2} has also been reported as a pre-catalyst for the Pt catalyzed hydrochlorination of cyclohexene. Alper et al. report the reaction of Pt(CO)Cl_{2}(C_{6}H_{10}) and HCl to form [Pt(CO)Cl_{2}]_{2} and liberate C_{6}H_{11}Cl. [Pt(CO)Cl_{2}]_{2} can then be reacted with two equivalents of cyclohexene to regenerate Pt(CO)Cl_{2}(C_{6}H_{10}). The overall reaction from these two steps is the catalyzed chlorination of cyclohexene.
