= Mark Wiesner =

American academic

Mark R. Wiesner
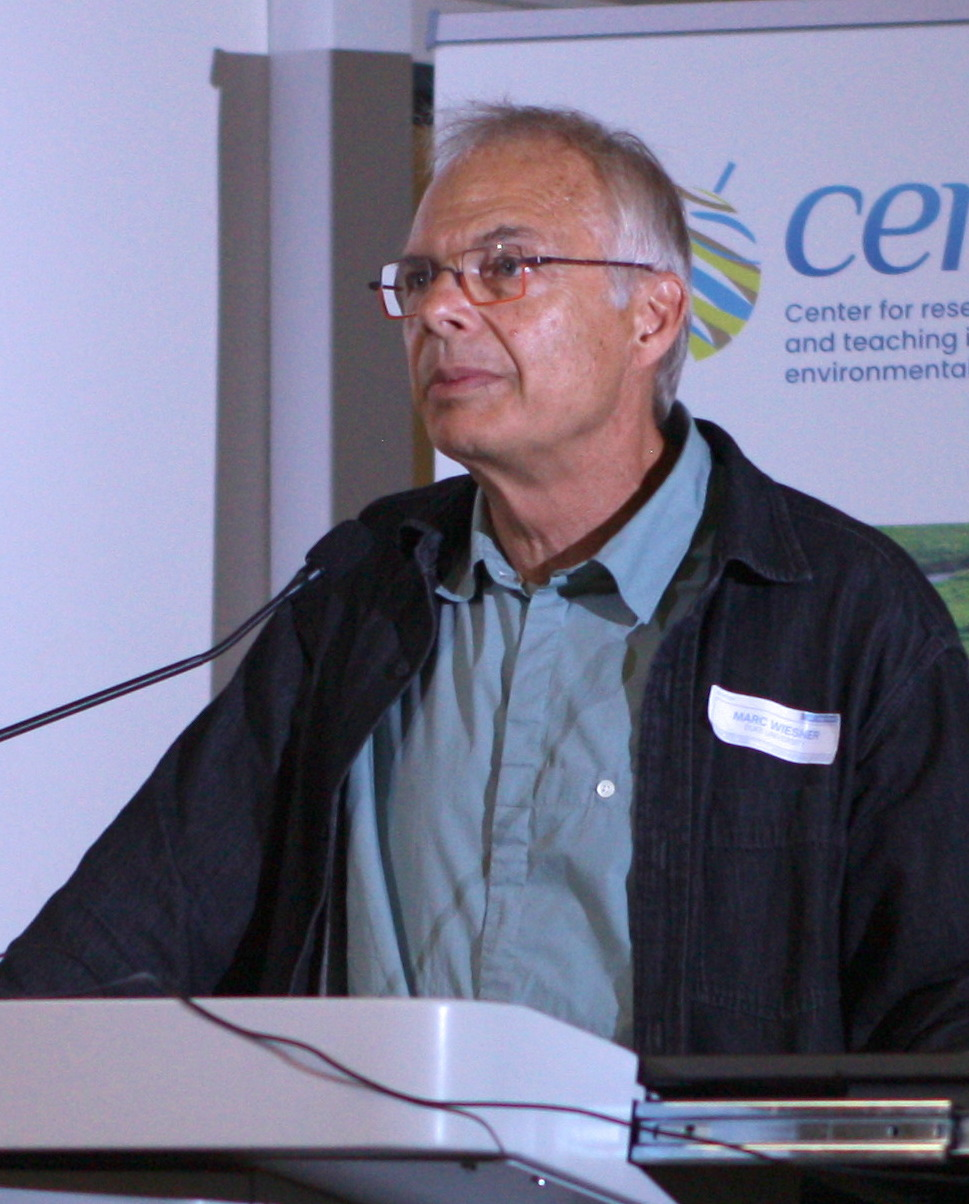
- Wiesner in August 2025
- Born: Mark Robert Wiesner
- Education: Coe College (BA); University of Iowa (MS); Johns Hopkins University (PhD); École nationale supérieure des industries chimiques (Post-doctoral research)
- Known for: Environmental nanotechnology, water treatment
- Scientific career
- Fields: Environmental engineering

Mark Wiesner is a French-American environmental engineer and academic. He is a Professor of Civil and Environmental Engineering at Duke University and director of the Center for the Environmental Implications of Nanotechnology (CEINT). He was elected to the National Academy of Engineering in 2015.

== Education and academic career ==
Wiesner received a B.A. in Mathematics and Biology from Coe College in 1978 and later graduated from the University of Iowa in 1980 with an M.S. in Civil and Environmental Engineering. In 1985, he obtained his Ph.D. in Environmental Engineering from Johns Hopkins University. He did post-doctoral research in Chemical Engineering at École nationale supérieure des industries chimiques in Nancy, France.

He joined the faculty at Rice University in 1988, where he was a professor in Rice University’s Department of Civil and Environmental Engineering. In 2006, Wiesner joined the faculty of Duke University. He was named James B. Duke Distinguished Professor of Civil and Environmental Engineering in 2015. Wiesner served as the department's chair from 2015 to 2021. He is also the director of Duke University’s Center for the Environmental Implications of Nanotechnology (CEINT). Wiesner has served on EPA’s Board of Scientific Counselors (USA), the EPA’s Science Advisory Board (USA), and the Steering Committee for the Agence Nationale de la Recherche (France).

== Research ==
Wiesner's research area includes environmental nanotechnology, membrane-based water treatment, Interface and colloid science, and environmental systems. He contributed to the development of pretreatment methods to reduce membrane fouling. He has published over 350 peer-reviewed articles. Wiesner co-edited the books Water Treatment Membrane Processes (1996) and Environmental Nanotechnology (2007).

== Awards and honors ==
- Clarke Prize from the National Water Research Institute (2011).
- Elected to the National Academy of Engineering (2015).
- Simon W. Freese Environmental Engineering Award from the American Society of Civil Engineers (2024).
