= École nationale supérieure des industries chimiques =

Engineering school in Nancy, France

Coordinates: 48°41′58″N 06°10′48″E

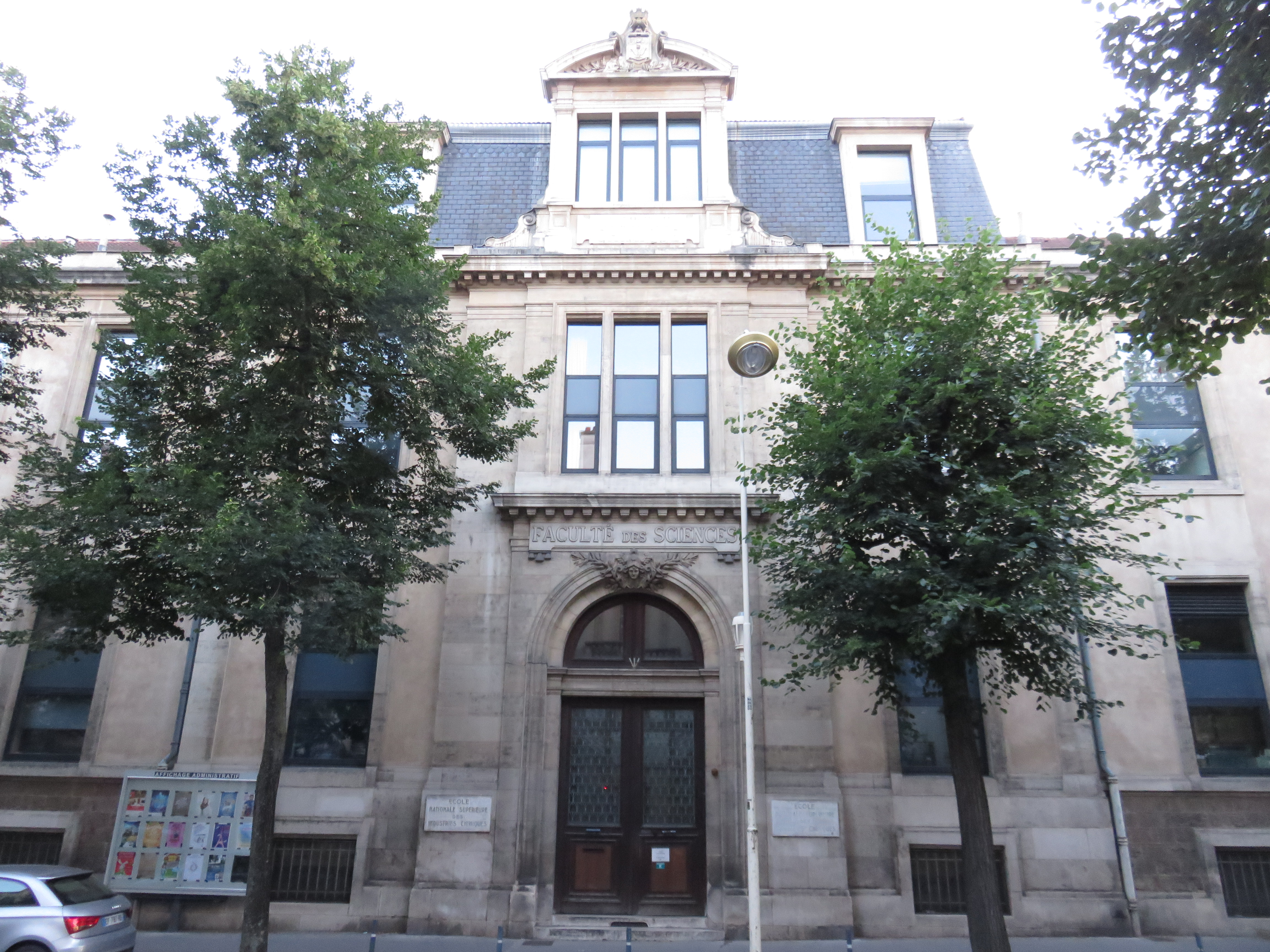
Building in 2018

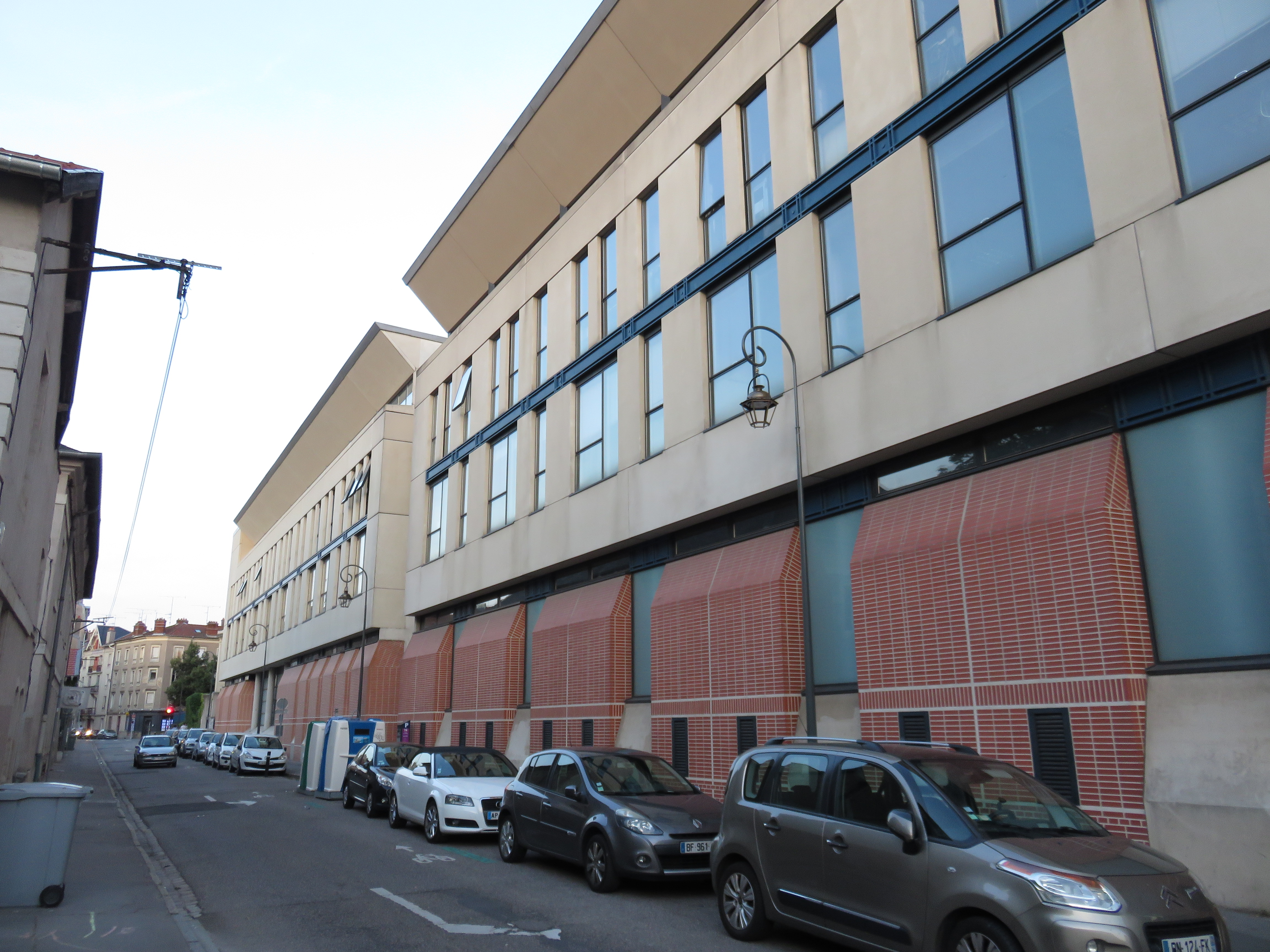
Building in 2018

The École Nationale Supérieure des Industries Chimiques (French pronunciation: [ekɔl nɑsjɔnal sypeʁjœʁ dez‿ɛ̃dystʁi ʃimik]; ENSIC) is an Engineering School dedicated to Chemical Engineering in Nancy, France.

Ensic Nancy is one of the seven schools of the Institut National Polytechnique de Lorraine (INPL), France's largest technological university.

== Creation ==
In October 1885, it was announced that the authorities were in favour of the creation of an institute of chemistry in Nancy. This pulled together a variety of chemical activities in the University of Nancy, with the specific aim of instructing young men in the practical application of chemistry to industry and agriculture. The decree authorizing the creation of the Institute was made on 8 September 1887 and construction began in 1888. The first 6 students joined in 1889 and Albin Haller was appointed as director on 30 July 1890. on 6 June 1892 it was formally inaugurated by the President of the Republic, Marie François Sadi Carnot.

== Notable achievements ==
One of its early professors, Victor Grignard, obtained the Nobel Prize in Chemistry in 1912 for his invention of the organo-metallic compounds known as "Grignard's reagents". After the Second World War, ENSIC introduced to France chemical engineering principles developed in the English-speaking world.

The school created a foundation in December 2008 to support its activities, called Fondation ENSIC, with the participation of Arkema.

== ENSIC Nancy in numbers ==
- 450 masters-level engineering students
- 200 internships in France and abroad
- 100 professors, assistant professors and CNRS researchers (permanent staff)
- 180 graduate students

== Engineering programs ==
ENSIC Nancy offers two masters-level engineering degrees accredited by the Commission des titres d'ingénieur (France) and by the Institution of Chemical Engineers (UK).

- " Ingénieur des Industries Chimiques" (I2C) three years after a 2-years preparatory program of intensive study.
- " Ingénieur des Techniques de l'Industrie" (FITI) : cooperative industrial-academic training program in Chemical Engineering Technology

== Continuing education ==
- A 2-year program open to Chemical Engineering technicians with 3–5 years of professional experience.
- 60 selected topical-courses delivered by the ENSIC Continuing Education Center.

== Research laboratories ==
2 Laboratories:

- LCPM: Laboratoire de Chimie Physique des Réactions (Polymer Science and Macromolecular Physical Chemistry)
- LRGP : Laboratoire de Réactions et Génie des Procédés

== Research activities ==
Research Activities in the following fields:

- Thermodynamics
- Fluid mechanics
- Chemical reaction engineering
- Chemical kinetics and catalysis
- Separation processes
- Transport phenomena
- Characterisation and synthesis of polymers
- Modelling and process control
- Chemical engineering in rheologically complex media
- Formulation and product engineering
- Bioorganic chemistry, biotechnology and bioengineering
- Photochemistry and photophysics
- Safety, health, energy and environment
- Micro- and nanotechnology
