= Antoine Prost =

French historian (born 1933)

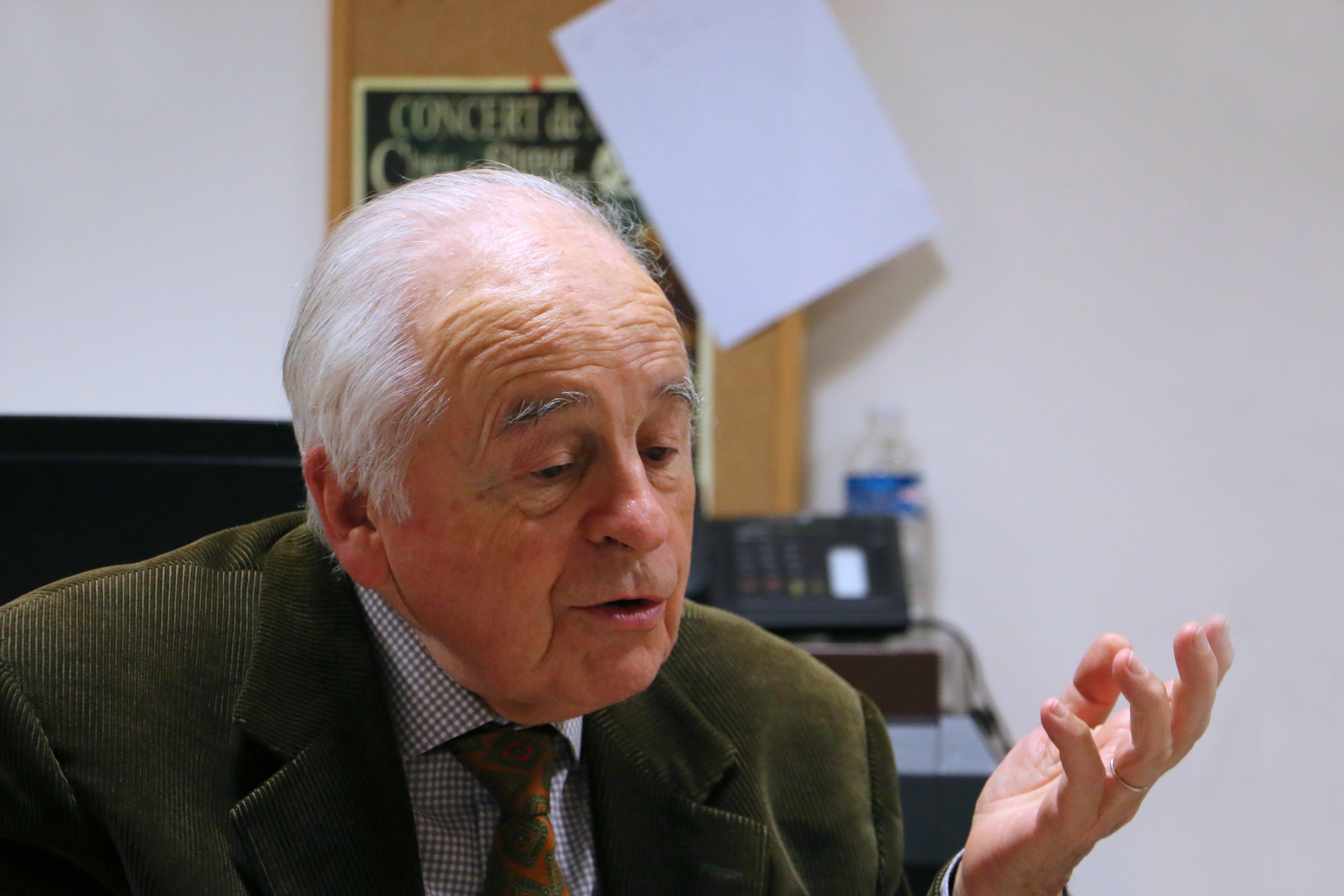
- Born: Antoine Marie François Prost; 29 October 1933 (age 92); Lons-le-Saunier, France
- Known for: Historian of 20th-century France

Academic background
- Education: Sciences Po, Paris, Paris-Sorbonne University

Antoine Marie François Prost (29 October 1933) is a French historian who served as Professor Emeritus of History, University of Paris Panthéon-Sorbonne. He specialises in 20th-century French history, in particular the First World War.

== Early life and education ==
Prost studied at the Lycée du Parc in Lyon, an École normale supérieure. From here, he attended university at the Paris Institute of Political Studies (Sciences Po, Paris), finishing in 1963. He completed his doctorate studies at the Paris-Sorbonne University, completing it in 1975 with a thesis titled: Veterans and French Society (1914-1939).

== Academic career ==
He began as a teacher at the Lycée Pothier in Orléans, before becoming an assistant, then assistant professor at the Sorbonne. Between 1969 and 1979, Prost held a Professorship at the University of Orleans, then at the university of Paris-I Panthéon-Sorbonne (1979-1998).

He also led the history Research Center of the social movements and trade unionism, later the Centre of Social History of the 20th Century. He is president of the association Le Mouvement social (which publishes the magazine of the same name) and of the Association des Amis du Maitron (2005-2012). He is a member of the board of directors of the University of Orléans.

Since 2012 he has been a member of the Committee for Prefectural History.

Since 2012 he has chaired the Scientific Council of the Mission of the Centenary of the First World War.

He also chairs the Scientific Council of the Verdun Memorial and the historical and educational committee of the Resistance Foundation.

== Awards ==
- Grand Officer of the Legion of Honour (He was elevated to the dignity of Grand Officer by decree on 31 December 2018 . He had been promoted to the rank of commander on 31 December 2012. He was an officer on 29 March 1993, and knight since 22 September 1984).
- Commander of the National Order of Merit
- Commander of the Order of Academic Palms
