= Paul Schützenberger =

French chemist

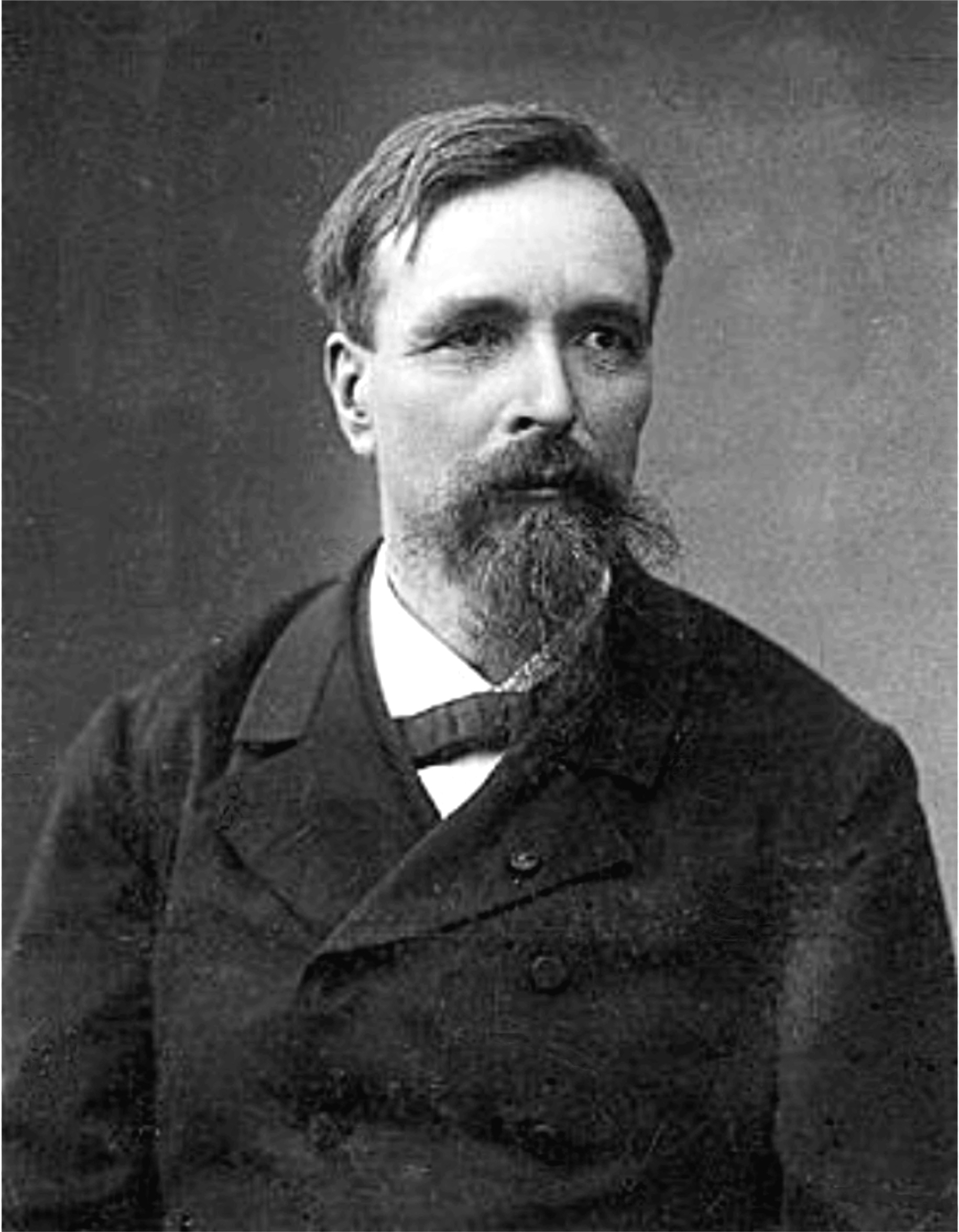
- Paul Schützenberger, c. 1863
- Born: 23 December 1829; Strasbourg, France
- Died: 26 June 1897 (aged 67)
- Scientific career
- Fields: Chemistry
- Thesis: Essai sur les substitutions des éléments électronégatifs aux métaux dans les sels, et sur les combinaisons des acides anhydres entre eux (1863)

Paul Schützenberger (23 December 1829 – 26 June 1897) was a French chemist. He was born in Strasbourg, where his father Georges Frédéric Schützenberger (1779–1859) was professor of law, and his uncle Charles Schützenberger (1809–1881) professor of chemical medicine.

He was intended for a medical career and graduated MD from the University of Strasbourg in 1855, but his interests laid in physical and chemical sciences. In 1853 he went to Paris as preparateur to JF Persoz (1805–1868), professor of chemistry at the Conservatoire des Arts et Métiers. A year later he was entrusted with a course of chemical instruction at Mulhouse, and he remained in that town until 1865 as professor at the École Supérieure des Sciences.

He then returned to Paris as assistant to AJ Balard at the College de France, in 1876 he succeeded him in the chair of chemistry, and in 1882 he became directing professor at the municipal École de Physique et de Chimie. The two latter chairs he held together until his death, which happened at Mézy, Seine et Oise.

During the period he spent at Mulhouse, Schützenberger paid special attention to industrial chemistry, particularly in connection with colouring matters, but he also worked at general and biological chemistry which subsequently occupied the greater part of his time. He is known for a long series of researches on the constitution of alkaloids and of the albuminoid bodies, and for the preparation of several new series of platinum compounds and of hyposulphurous acid, H_{2}S_{2}O_{4}.

Towards the end of his life he adopted the view that the elements have been formed by some process of condensation from one primordial substance of extremely small atomic weight, and he expressed the conviction that atomic weights within narrow limits are variable and modified according to the physical conditions in which a compound is formed.

His publications include:

- Chimie appliquée à la physiologie et à la pathologie animale (1863);
- Traité des matières colorantes (1867);
- Les Fermentations (1875), which was translated into German, Italian and English;
- Traité de chimie générale in seven volumes (1880–1894).

== See also ==
- French painter René Schützenberger was his son
- French mathematician Marcel-Paul Schützenberger was his great grandson
- History of ESPCI Paris
