= Albin Haller =

French chemist (1849–1925)

Albin Haller

Albin Haller (7 March 1849, Fellering – 1 May 1925) was a French chemist.

Haller founded the École Nationale Supérieure des Industries Chimiques in Nancy and in 1917 won the Davy Medal of the Royal Society "On the ground of his important researches in the domain of organic chemistry". Appointed to the French Academy of Sciences in 1900, he served as its president beginning in 1923. He was also a member of the French Académie Nationale de Médecine.

Haller was married to a cousin of Henri Poincaré. Haller and Poincaré were close friends.

== Selected publications ==
- A. Haller (1894) Produits chimiques et pharmaceutiques: materiel de la peinture parfumerie, savonnerie (Imprimerie Nationale)
- A. Haller (1895) L'industrie chimique (J.B. Baillière et fils)
- A. Haller (1903) Les industries chimiques et pharmaceutiques (Gauthier-Villars)
