= Charles Lauth =

French chemist

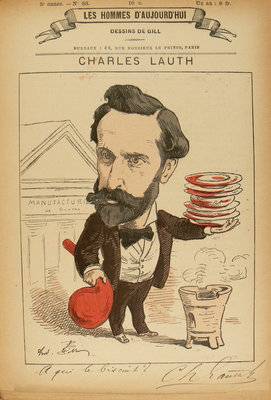
Charles Lauth as caricatured by Gill

Charles Lauth (1836–1913) was a French chemist. He synthesised methyl violet.

In 1883 he was elected president of the Chemical Society of France.
