= Gyromagnetic ratio =

Ratio of magnetic moment to angular momentum

In physics, the gyromagnetic ratio (also sometimes known as the magnetogyric ratio in other disciplines) of a particle or system is the ratio of its magnetic moment to its angular momentum, and it is often denoted by the symbol γ, gamma. Its SI unit is the reciprocal second per tesla (s^{−1}⋅T^{−1}) or, equivalently, the coulomb per kilogram (C⋅kg^{−1}).

The g-factor of a particle is a related dimensionless value of the system, derived as the ratio of its gyromagnetic ratio to that which would be classically expected from a rigid body of which the mass and charge are distributed identically, and for which total mass and charge are the same as that of the system.

== For a classical rotating body ==
Consider a nonconductive charged body rotating about an axis of symmetry. According to the laws of classical physics, it has both a magnetic dipole moment due to the movement of charge and an angular momentum due to the movement of mass arising from its rotation. It can be shown that as long as its charge and mass densities and currents are distributed identically and rotationally symmetric, its gyromagnetic ratio is

$$\gamma = \frac{q}{2m},$$

where q is its charge, and m is its mass.

The derivation of this relation is as follows. It suffices to demonstrate this for an infinitesimally narrow circular ring within the body, as the general result then follows from an integration. Suppose the ring has radius r, area A = πr^{2}, mass m, charge q, and angular momentum L = mvr. Then the magnitude of the magnetic dipole moment is

$$\mu = I A = \frac{q v}{2 \pi r} \, \pi r^2 = \frac{q}{2m} \, m v r = \frac{q}{2m} L.$$

== For an isolated electron ==
An isolated electron has an angular momentum and a magnetic moment resulting from its spin. While an electron's spin is sometimes visualized as a rotation of a rigid body about an axis, the magnetic moment cannot be attributed to mass distributed identically to the charge in such a model since it is close to twice what this would predict. The correcting factor needed relative to classical relation is called the electron's g-factor, which is denoted g_{e}:
$$\gamma_{\text{e}^-} = \frac{\mu_{\text{e}^-}}{\hbar/2} = -g_\text{e} \frac{-e}{2 m_\text{e}} = g_\text{e} \frac{\mu_\text{B}}{\hbar},$$
where μ_{e^{−}} is the electron's magnetic moment, ħ/2 is the angular momentum (spin) of the electron, and μ_{B} is the Bohr magneton.

The gyromagnetic ratio due to electron spin is roughly twice that due to the orbiting of an electron.

The electron gyromagnetic ratio is

$\gamma_{\text{e}^-}$ = −1.76085962784(55)×10^{11} s^{−1}⋅T^{−1}

The ratio of the electron's Larmor frequency to the magnetic flux density is

$\bar\gamma_{\text{e}^-} = \frac{\gamma_{\text{e}^-}}{2\pi}$ = −28024.9513861(87) MHz⋅T^{−1}

The electron gyromagnetic ratio γ (and its g-factor g_{e}) are in excellent agreement with theory; see Precision tests of QED for details.

In the framework of relativistic quantum mechanics,
$$g_\text{e} = -2 \left(1 + \frac{\alpha}{2\pi} + \cdots\right),$$
where $\alpha$ is the fine-structure constant. Here the small corrections to g = −2 come from the quantum field theory calculations of the anomalous magnetic dipole moment. The electron g-factor is known to twelve decimal places by measuring the electron magnetic moment in a one-electron cyclotron:

$g_\text{e}$ = −2.00231930436092(36).

== g-factor not as a consequence of relativity ==
Since a g-factor equal to −2 follows from Dirac's equation, it is a frequent misconception to think that a g-factor −2 is a consequence of relativity; it is not. The factor −2 can be obtained from the linearization of both the Schrödinger equation (known as the Lévy-Leblond equation) and the relativistic Klein–Gordon equation (which is implied by the Dirac equation). In both cases a 4-spinor is obtained and for both linearizations the g-factor is found to be equal to −2. Therefore, the factor −2 is a consequence of the minimal coupling and of the fact of having the same order of derivatives for space and time.

== For a nucleus ==
The sign of the gyromagnetic ratio, γ, determines the sense of precession. While the magnetic moments (the black arrows) are oriented the same for both cases of γ, the precession is in opposite directions. Spin and magnetic moment are in the same direction for γ > 0 (as for protons).

Protons, neutrons, and many nuclei carry nuclear spin, which gives rise to a gyromagnetic ratio as above. The ratio is conventionally written in terms of the proton mass and charge, even for neutrons and for other nuclei, for the sake of simplicity and consistency. The formula is:

$$\gamma_\text{n} = \frac{e}{2m_\text{p}} \, g_\text{n} = g_\text{n}\, \frac{\mu_\text{N}}{\hbar},$$

where $\mu_\text{N}$ is the nuclear magneton, and $g_\text{n}$ is the g-factor of the nucleon or nucleus in question. The ratio $\frac{\gamma_n}{2 \pi \, g_\text{n}} = \mu_\text{N}/h = 7.622\ 593\ 2188(24)$ MHz/T.

The gyromagnetic ratio of a nucleus plays a role in nuclear magnetic resonance (NMR) and magnetic resonance imaging (MRI). These procedures rely on the fact that bulk magnetization due to nuclear spins precess in a magnetic field at a rate called the Larmor frequency, which is simply the product of the gyromagnetic ratio with the magnetic field strength. With this phenomenon, the sign of γ determines the sense (clockwise vs. counterclockwise) of precession. Within atoms and molecules some shielding occurs, with the effect that the nucleus experiences a slightly modified magnetic flux density, which changes the observed precession frequency compared to that of an isolated nucleus in the same applied magnetic field.

Most common nuclei such as ^{1}H and ^{13}C have positive gyromagnetic ratios. Approximate values for some common nuclei are given in the table below.

Nucleus	γ_{n} [s^{−1}⋅T^{−1}]	γ̅_{n} [MHz⋅T^{−1}]
^{1}H^{+}	2.6752218708(11)×10^{8}	42.577478461(18)
^{2}H	4.1065×10^{7}	6.536
^{3}H	2.853508×10^{8}	45.415
^{3}He	−2.0378946078(18)×10^{8}	−32.434100033(28)
^{7}Li	1.03962×10^{8}	16.546
^{13}C	6.72828×10^{7}	10.7084
^{14}N	1.9331×10^{7}	3.077
^{15}N	−2.7116×10^{7}	−4.316
^{17}O	−3.6264×10^{7}	−5.772
^{19}F	2.51815×10^{8}	40.078
^{23}Na	7.0761×10^{7}	11.262
^{27}Al	6.9763×10^{7}	11.103
^{29}Si	−5.3190×10^{7}	−8.465
^{31}P	1.08291×10^{8}	17.235
^{35}Cl	2.6237×10^{7}	4.176
^{57}Fe	8.681×10^{6}	1.382
^{63}Cu	7.1118×10^{7}	11.319
^{67}Zn	1.6767×10^{7}	2.669
^{129}Xe	−7.3995401(2)×10^{7}	−11.7767338(3)

A full list can be found in the external link section below.

== Larmor precession ==
Any free system with a constant gyromagnetic ratio, such as a rigid system of charges, a nucleus, or an electron, when placed in an external magnetic field $\mathbf{B}$ (measured in teslas) that is not aligned with its magnetic moment, will precess at a frequency f (measured in hertz) that is proportional to the external field:

$$f = \frac{\gamma}{2\pi} B .$$

For this reason, values of $\overline\gamma = \frac{\gamma}{2\pi}$, with the unit hertz per tesla (Hz/T), are often quoted instead of $\gamma$.

=== Heuristic derivation ===
The derivation of this ratio is as follows: First we must prove the torque resulting from subjecting a magnetic moment $\mathbf{m}$ to a magnetic field $\mathbf{B}$ is $\boldsymbol{\Tau} = \mathbf{m} \times \mathbf{B}.$ The identity of the functional form of the stationary electric and magnetic fields has led to defining the magnitude of the magnetic dipole moment equally well as $m=I\pi r^2$, or in the following way, imitating the moment $\mathbf{p}$ of an electric dipole: The magnetic dipole can be represented by a needle of a compass with fictitious magnetic charges $\pm q_\text{m}$ on the two poles and vector distance between the poles $\mathbf{d}$ under the influence of the magnetic field of earth $\mathbf{B}.$ By classical mechanics the torque on this needle is $\boldsymbol{\Tau} = q_\text{m}(\mathbf{d} \times \mathbf{B}).$ But as previously stated $q_\text{m} \mathbf{d} = I\pi r^2 \hat{\mathbf{d}} = \mathbf{m},$ so the desired formula comes up. $\hat{\mathbf{d}}$ is the unit distance vector.

The spinning electron model here is analogous to a gyroscope. For any rotating body the rate of change of the angular momentum $\mathbf{J}$ equals the applied torque $\mathbf{T}$:

$$\frac{d\mathbf{J}}{dt} = \mathbf{T}.$$

Note as an example the precession of a gyroscope. The earth's gravitational attraction applies a force or torque to the gyroscope in the vertical direction, and the angular momentum vector along the axis of the gyroscope rotates slowly about a vertical line through the pivot. In place of a gyroscope, imagine a sphere spinning around the axis with its centre on the pivot of the gyroscope, and along the axis of the gyroscope two oppositely directed vectors both originated in the centre of the sphere, upwards $\mathbf{J}$ and downwards $\mathbf{m}$. Replace the gravity with a magnetic flux density $\mathbf{B}$.

$\frac{d\mathbf{J}}{dt}$ represents the linear velocity of the pike of the arrow $\mathbf{J}$ along a circle whose radius is $J\sin{\phi},$ where $\phi$ is the angle between $\mathbf{J}$ and the vertical. Hence the angular velocity of the rotation of the spin is

$$\omega = 2\pi \,f = \frac{1}{J \sin{\phi}} \left|\frac{d\mathbf{J}}{dt}\right|
= \frac{|\mathbf{T}|}{J \sin{\phi}} = \frac{|\mathbf{m} \times \mathbf{B}|}{J \sin{\phi}}
= \frac{m\,B\sin{\phi}}{J \sin{\phi}} = \frac{m\, B}{J} = \gamma\, B.$$

Consequently, $f = \frac{\gamma}{2\pi}\,B,\quad \text{q.e.d.}$

This relationship also explains an apparent contradiction between the two equivalent terms, gyromagnetic ratio versus magnetogyric ratio: whereas it is a ratio of a magnetic property (i.e. dipole moment) to a gyric (rotational, from Greek: γύρος, "turn") property (i.e. angular momentum), it is also a ratio between the angular precession frequency (another gyric property) $\omega = 2\pi f$ and the magnetic flux density.

The angular precession frequency has an important physical meaning: It is the angular cyclotron frequency, the resonance frequency of an ionized plasma being under the influence of a static finite magnetic field, when we superimpose a high frequency electromagnetic field.

== See also ==
- Charge-to-mass ratio
- Chemical shift
- Landé g-factor
- Larmor equation
- Proton gyromagnetic ratio
