= Hyperfine structure =

Type of structure in atomic physics

In atomic physics, hyperfine structure is defined by small shifts in otherwise degenerate electronic energy levels and the resulting splittings in those electronic energy levels of atoms, molecules, and ions, due to electromagnetic multipole interaction between the nucleus and electron clouds.

In atoms, hyperfine structure arises from the energy of the nuclear magnetic dipole moment interacting with the magnetic field generated by the electrons and the energy of the nuclear electric quadrupole moment in the electric field gradient due to the distribution of charge within the atom. Molecular hyperfine structure is generally dominated by these two effects, but also includes the energy associated with the interaction between the magnetic moments associated with different magnetic nuclei in a molecule, as well as between the nuclear magnetic moments and the magnetic field generated by the rotation of the molecule.

Hyperfine structure contrasts with fine structure, which results from the interaction between the magnetic moments associated with electron spin and the electrons' orbital angular momentum. Hyperfine structure, with energy shifts typically orders of magnitude smaller than those of a fine-structure shift, results from the interactions of the nucleus (or nuclei, in molecules) with internally generated electric and magnetic fields.

Schematic illustration of fine and hyperfine structure in a neutral hydrogen atom

== History ==
The first theory of atomic hyperfine structure was given in 1930 by Enrico Fermi for an atom containing a single valence electron with an arbitrary angular momentum. The Zeeman splitting of this structure was discussed by S. A. Goudsmit and R. F. Bacher later that year.

In 1935, H. Schüler and Theodor Schmidt proposed the existence of a nuclear quadrupole moment in order to explain anomalies in the hyperfine structure of europium, cassiopium (older name for lutetium), indium, antimony, and mercury.

== Theory ==
The theory of hyperfine structure comes directly from electromagnetism, consisting of the interaction of the nuclear multipole moments (excluding the electric monopole) with internally generated fields. The theory is derived first for the atomic case, but can be applied to each nucleus in a molecule. Following this there is a discussion of the additional effects unique to the molecular case.

=== Atomic hyperfine structure ===
==== Magnetic dipole ====
The dominant term in the hyperfine Hamiltonian is typically the magnetic dipole term. Atomic nuclei with a non-zero nuclear spin $\mathbf{I}$ have a magnetic dipole moment, given by:
$$\boldsymbol{\mu}_\text{I} = g_\text{I}\mu_\text{N}\mathbf{I},$$
where $g_\text{I}$ is the g-factor and $\mu_\text{N}$ is the nuclear magneton.

There is an energy associated with a magnetic dipole moment in the presence of a magnetic field. For a nuclear magnetic dipole moment, μ_{I}, placed in a magnetic field, B, the relevant term in the Hamiltonian is given by:
$$\hat{H}_\text{D} = -\boldsymbol{\mu}_\text{I}\cdot\mathbf{B}.$$

In the absence of an externally applied field, the magnetic field experienced by the nucleus is that associated with the orbital (ℓ) and spin (s) angular momentum of the electrons:
$$\mathbf{B} \equiv \mathbf{B}_\text{el} = \mathbf{B}_\text{el}^\ell + \mathbf{B}_\text{el}^s.$$

===== Electron orbital magnetic field =====
Electron orbital angular momentum results from the motion of the electron about some fixed external point that we shall take to be the location of the nucleus. The magnetic field at the nucleus due to the motion of a single electron, with charge –e at a position r relative to the nucleus, is given by:
$$\mathbf{B}_\text{el}^\ell = \frac{\mu_0}{4\pi}\frac{-e\mathbf{v} \times -\mathbf{r}}{r^3},$$
where −r gives the position of the nucleus relative to the electron. Written in terms of the Bohr magneton, this gives:
$$\mathbf{B}_\text{el}^\ell = -2\mu_\text{B} \frac{\mu_0}{4\pi}\frac{1}{r^3} \frac{\mathbf{r} \times m_\text{e}\mathbf{v}}{\hbar}.$$

Recognizing that m_{e}v is the electron momentum, p, and that r × p / ħ is the orbital angular momentum in units of ħ, ℓ, we can write:
$$\mathbf{B}_\text{el}^\ell = -2\mu_\text{B}\frac{\mu_0}{4\pi}\frac{1}{r^3}\boldsymbol{\ell}.$$

For a many-electron atom this expression is generally written in terms of the total orbital angular momentum, $\mathbf{L}$, by summing over the electrons and using the projection operator, $\varphi^\ell_i$, where $\sum_i\mathbf{\ell}_i = \sum_i\varphi^\ell_i\mathbf{L}$. For states with a well defined projection of the orbital angular momentum, L_{z}, we can write $\varphi^\ell_i = \hat{\ell}_{z_i}/L_z$, giving:
$$\mathbf{B}_\text{el}^\ell = -2\mu_\text{B} \frac{\mu_0}{4\pi} \frac{1}{L_z}\sum_i\frac{\hat{\ell}_{zi}}{r_i^3}\mathbf{L}.$$

==== Electron spin magnetic field ====
The electron spin angular momentum is a fundamentally different property that is intrinsic to the particle and therefore does not depend on the motion of the electron. Nonetheless, it is angular momentum and any angular momentum associated with a charged particle results in a magnetic dipole moment, which is the source of a magnetic field. An electron with spin angular momentum, s, has a magnetic moment, μ_{s}, given by:
$$\boldsymbol{\mu}_\text{s} = -g_s\mu_\text{B}\mathbf{s},$$
where g_{s} is the electron spin g-factor and the negative sign is because the electron is negatively charged (consider that negatively and positively charged particles with identical mass, travelling on equivalent paths, would have the same angular momentum, but would result in currents in the opposite direction).

The magnetic field of a point dipole moment, μ_{s}, is given by:
$$\mathbf{B}_\text{el}^s = \frac{\mu_0}{4\pi r^3} \left(3\left(\boldsymbol{\mu}_\text{s} \cdot \hat{\mathbf{r}}\right) \hat{\mathbf{r}} - \boldsymbol{\mu}_\text{s}\right) + \dfrac{2\mu_0}{3} \boldsymbol{\mu}_\text{s}\delta^3(\mathbf{r}).$$

==== Electron total magnetic field and contribution ====
The complete magnetic dipole contribution to the hyperfine Hamiltonian is thus given by:
$$\begin{align}
\hat{H}_\text{D} ={} &2g_\text{I}\mu_\text{N}\mu_\text{B} \dfrac{\mu_0}{4\pi}\dfrac{1}{L_z} \sum_i \dfrac{\hat{\ell}_{zi}}{r_i^3} \mathbf{I} \cdot \mathbf{L} \\
& {}+ g_\text{I}\mu_\text{N}g_\text{s}\mu_\text{B} \frac{\mu_0}{4\pi} \frac{1}{S_z}\sum_i \frac{\hat{s}_{zi}}{r_i^3} \left\{ 3\left(\mathbf{I} \cdot \hat{\mathbf{r}}\right)\left(\mathbf{S}\cdot\hat{\mathbf{r}}\right) - \mathbf{I}\cdot\mathbf{S}\right\} \\
& {}+ \frac{2}{3} g_\text{I}\mu_\text{N}g_\text{s}\mu_\text{B}\mu_0 \frac{1}{S_z}\sum_i\hat{s}_{zi}\delta^3{\left(\mathbf{r}_i\right)} \mathbf{I}\cdot\mathbf{S}.
\end{align}$$

The first term gives the energy of the nuclear dipole in the field due to the electronic orbital angular momentum. The second term gives the energy of the "finite distance" interaction of the nuclear dipole with the field due to the electron spin magnetic moments. The final term, often known as the Fermi contact term relates to the direct interaction of the nuclear dipole with the spin dipoles and is only non-zero for states with a finite electron spin density at the position of the nucleus (those with unpaired electrons in s-subshells). It has been argued that one may get a different expression when taking into account the detailed nuclear magnetic moment distribution. The inclusion of the delta function is an admission that the singularity in the magnetic induction B owing to a magnetic dipole moment at a point is not integrable. It is B which mediates the interaction between the Pauli spinors in non-relativistic quantum mechanics. Fermi (1930) avoided the difficulty by working with the relativistic Dirac wave equation, according to which the mediating field for the Dirac spinors is the four-vector potential (V,A). The component V is the Coulomb potential. The component A is the three-vector magnetic potential (such that B = curl A), which for the point dipole is integrable.

For states with $\ell \neq 0$ this can be expressed in the form
$$\hat{H}_\text{D} = 2 g_I \mu_\text{B} \mu_\text{N} \dfrac{\mu_0}{4\pi} \dfrac{\mathbf{I}\cdot\mathbf{N}}{r^3},$$
where:
$$\mathbf{N} = \boldsymbol{\ell} - \frac{g_s}{2} \left[\mathbf{s} - 3(\mathbf{s}\cdot \hat{\mathbf{r}})\hat{\mathbf{r}}\right].$$

If hyperfine structure is small compared with the fine structure (sometimes called IJ-coupling by analogy with LS-coupling), I and J are good quantum numbers and matrix elements of $\hat{H}_\text{D}$ can be approximated as diagonal in I and J. In this case (generally true for light elements), we can project N onto J (where J = L + S is the total electronic angular momentum) and we have:
$$\hat{H}_\text{D} = 2 g_I \mu_\text{B} \mu_\text{N} \dfrac{\mu_0}{4\pi} \dfrac{\mathbf{N}\cdot\mathbf{J}}{\mathbf{J}\cdot\mathbf{J}} \dfrac{\mathbf{I}\cdot\mathbf{J}}{r^3}.$$

This is commonly written as
$$\hat{H}_\text{D} = \hat{A}\mathbf{I}\cdot\mathbf{J},$$
with $\left\langle\hat{A}\right\rangle$ being the hyperfine-structure constant which is determined by experiment. Since I⋅J = 1/2{F⋅F − I⋅I − J⋅J} (where F = I + J is the total angular momentum), this gives an energy of:
$$\Delta E_\text{D} = \frac{1}{2}\left\langle\hat{A}\right\rangle[F(F + 1) - I(I + 1) - J(J + 1)].$$

In this case the hyperfine interaction satisfies the Landé interval rule.

==== Electric quadrupole ====
Atomic nuclei with spin $I \ge 1$ have an electric quadrupole moment. In the general case this is represented by a rank-2 tensor, $Q_{ij}$, with components given by:
$$Q_{ij} = \frac{1}{e} \int\left(3x_i^\prime x_j^\prime - \left(r'\right)^2 \delta_{ij}\right)\rho{\left(\mathbf{r}'\right)} \, d^3\mathbf{r}',$$
where i and j are the tensor indices running from 1 to 3, x_{i} and x_{j} are the spatial variables x, y and z depending on the values of i and j respectively, δ_{ij} is the Kronecker delta and ρ(r) is the charge density. Being a 3-dimensional rank-2 tensor, the quadrupole moment has 3^{2} = 9 components. From the definition of the components it is clear that the quadrupole tensor is a symmetric matrix (Q_{ij} = Q_{ji}) that is also traceless ($\operatorname{tr} Q = \sum_i Q_{ii} = 0$), giving only five components in the irreducible representation. Expressed using the notation of irreducible spherical tensors we have:
$$T^2_m(Q) = \sqrt{\frac{4\pi}{5}} \int \rho{\left(\mathbf{r}'\right)} \left(r'\right)^2 Y^2_m\left(\theta', \varphi'\right) \, d^3\mathbf{r}'.$$

The energy associated with an electric quadrupole moment in an electric field depends not on the field strength, but on the electric field gradient, confusingly labelled $\underline{\underline{q}}$, another rank-2 tensor given by the outer product of the del operator with the electric field vector:
$$\underline{\underline{q}} = \nabla\otimes\mathbf{E},$$
with components given by:
$$q_{ij} = \frac{\partial^2V}{\partial x_i \, \partial x_j}.$$

Again it is clear this is a symmetric matrix and, because the source of the electric field at the nucleus is a charge distribution entirely outside the nucleus, this can be expressed as a 5-component spherical tensor, $T^2(q)$, with:
$$\begin{align}
T^2_0   (q) &= \frac{\sqrt{6}}{2} q_{zz} \\
T^2_{+1}(q) &= -q_{xz} - i q_{yz} \\
T^2_{+2}(q) &= \frac{1}{2}(q_{xx} - q_{yy}) + iq_{xy},
\end{align}$$
where:
$$T^2_{-m}(q) = (-1)^mT^2_{+m}(q)^*.$$

The quadrupolar term in the Hamiltonian is thus given by:
$$\hat{H}_Q = -e T^2(Q) \cdot T^2(q) = -e\sum_m (-1)^m T^2_m(Q) T^2_{-m}(q).$$

A typical atomic nucleus closely approximates cylindrical symmetry and therefore all off-diagonal elements are close to zero. For this reason the nuclear electric quadrupole moment is often represented by Q_{zz}.

=== Molecular hyperfine structure ===
The molecular hyperfine Hamiltonian includes those terms already derived for the atomic case with a magnetic dipole term for each nucleus with $I > 0$ and an electric quadrupole term for each nucleus with $I \geq 1$. The magnetic dipole terms were first derived for diatomic molecules by Frosch and Foley, and the resulting hyperfine parameters are often called the Frosch and Foley parameters.

In addition to the effects described above, there are a number of effects specific to the molecular case.

==== Direct nuclear spin–spin ====
Each nucleus with $I > 0$ has a non-zero magnetic moment that is both the source of a magnetic field and has an associated energy due to the presence of the combined field of all of the other nuclear magnetic moments. A summation over each magnetic moment dotted with the field due to each other magnetic moment gives the direct nuclear spin–spin term in the hyperfine Hamiltonian, $\hat{H}_{II}$.
$$\hat{H}_{II} = -\sum_{\alpha\neq\alpha'} \boldsymbol{\mu}_\alpha \cdot \mathbf{B}_{\alpha'},$$
where α and α' are indices representing the nucleus contributing to the energy and the nucleus that is the source of the field respectively. Substituting in the expressions for the dipole moment in terms of the nuclear angular momentum and the magnetic field of a dipole, both given above, we have
$$\hat{H}_{II} =
\dfrac{\mu_0\mu_\text{N}^2}{4\pi} \sum_{\alpha\neq\alpha'} \frac{g_\alpha g_{\alpha'}}{R_{\alpha\alpha'}^3} \left\{
\mathbf{I}_\alpha\cdot\mathbf{I}_{\alpha'} -
3\left(\mathbf{I}_\alpha \cdot \hat{\mathbf{R}}_{\alpha\alpha'}\right)\left(\mathbf{I}_{\alpha'} \cdot \hat{\mathbf{R}}_{\alpha\alpha'}\right)
\right\}.$$

==== Nuclear spin–rotation ====
The nuclear magnetic moments in a molecule exist in a magnetic field due to the angular momentum, T (R is the internuclear displacement vector), associated with the bulk rotation of the molecule, thus
$$\hat{H}_\text{IR} =
\frac{e\mu_0\mu_\text{N}\hbar}{4\pi}\sum_{\alpha \neq \alpha'} \frac{1}{R_{\alpha\alpha'}^3}
\left\{\frac{Z_\alpha g_{\alpha'}}{M_\alpha} \mathbf{I}_{\alpha'} +
\frac{Z_{\alpha'}g_\alpha}{M_{\alpha'}} \mathbf{I}_\alpha\right\}\cdot\mathbf{T}.$$

==== Small molecule hyperfine structure ====
A typical simple example of the hyperfine structure due to the interactions discussed above is in the rotational transitions of hydrogen cyanide (^{1}H^{12}C^{14}N) in its ground vibrational state. Here, the electric quadrupole interaction is due to the ^{14}N-nucleus, the hyperfine nuclear spin-spin splitting is from the magnetic coupling between nitrogen, ^{14}N (I_{N} = 1), and hydrogen, ^{1}H (I_{H} = 1/2), and a hydrogen spin-rotation interaction due to the ^{1}H-nucleus. These contributing interactions to the hyperfine structure in the molecule are listed here in descending order of influence. Sub-doppler techniques have been used to discern the hyperfine structure in HCN rotational transitions.

The dipole selection rules for HCN hyperfine structure transitions are $\Delta J = 1$, $\Delta F = \{0, \pm 1\}$, where J is the rotational quantum number and F is the total rotational quantum number inclusive of nuclear spin ($F = J + I_\text{N}$), respectively. The lowest transition ($J = 1 \rightarrow 0$) splits into a hyperfine triplet. Using the selection rules, the hyperfine pattern of $J = 2 \rightarrow 1$ transition and higher dipole transitions is in the form of a hyperfine sextet. However, one of these components ($\Delta F = -1$) carries only 0.6% of the rotational transition intensity in the case of $J = 2 \rightarrow 1$. This contribution drops for increasing J. So, from $J = 2 \rightarrow 1$ upwards the hyperfine pattern consists of three very closely spaced stronger hyperfine components ($\Delta J = 1$, $\Delta F = 1$) together with two widely spaced components; one on the low frequency side and one on the high frequency side relative to the central hyperfine triplet. Each of these outliers carry ~$\tfrac{1}{2} J^2$ (J is the upper rotational quantum number of the allowed dipole transition) the intensity of the entire transition. For consecutively higher-J transitions, there are small but significant changes in the relative intensities and positions of each individual hyperfine component.

== Measurements and applications ==
Hyperfine interactions can be measured, among other ways, in atomic and molecular spectra, and in electron paramagnetic resonance spectra of free radicals and transition-metal ions.

=== Astrophysics ===
The hyperfine transition as depicted on the Pioneer plaque

As the hyperfine splitting is very small, the transition frequencies are usually not located in the optical, but are in the range of radio- or microwave (also called sub-millimeter) frequencies.

Hyperfine structure gives the 21 cm line observed in H I regions in interstellar medium.

Carl Sagan and Frank Drake considered the hyperfine transition of hydrogen to be a sufficiently universal phenomenon so as to be used as a base unit of time and length on the Pioneer plaque and later Voyager Golden Record.

In submillimeter astronomy, heterodyne receivers are widely used in detecting electromagnetic signals from celestial objects such as star-forming core or young stellar objects. The separations among neighboring components in a hyperfine spectrum of an observed rotational transition are usually small enough to fit within the receiver's IF band. Since the optical depth varies with frequency, strength ratios among the hyperfine components differ from that of their intrinsic (or optically thin) intensities (these are so-called hyperfine anomalies, often observed in the rotational transitions of HCN). Thus, a more accurate determination of the optical depth is possible. From this, the object's physical parameters may be derived.

=== Nuclear spectroscopy ===
Hyperfine splitting in ferromagnetic cobalt at 3.5 K, observed by quasielastic neutron scattering.

In nuclear spectroscopy methods, the nucleus is used to probe the local structure in materials. The methods mainly base on hyperfine interactions with the surrounding atoms and ions. Important methods are nuclear magnetic resonance, Mössbauer spectroscopy, perturbed angular correlation, and high-resolution inelastic neutron scattering.

=== Nuclear technology ===
The atomic vapor laser isotope separation (AVLIS) process uses the hyperfine splitting between optical transitions in uranium-235 and uranium-238 to selectively photo-ionize only the uranium-235 atoms and then separate the ionized particles from the non-ionized ones. Precisely tuned dye lasers are used as the sources of the necessary exact wavelength radiation.

=== Use in defining the SI second and meter ===
The hyperfine structure transition can be used to make a microwave notch filter with very high stability, repeatability, and Q factor, which can thus be used as a basis for very precise atomic clocks. The term transition frequency denotes the frequency of radiation corresponding to the transition between the two hyperfine levels of the atom, and is equal to f = ΔE/h, where ΔE is difference in energy between the levels and h is the Planck constant. Typically, the transition frequency of a particular isotope of caesium or rubidium atoms is used as a basis for these clocks.

Due to the accuracy of hyperfine structure transition-based atomic clocks, they are now used as the basis for the definition of the second. One second is now defined to be exactly 9192631770 cycles of the hyperfine structure transition frequency of caesium-133 atoms.

On October 21, 1983, the 17th CGPM defined the meter as the length of the path travelled by light in a vacuum during a time interval of 1/299,792,458 of a second.

=== Precision tests of quantum electrodynamics ===
The hyperfine splitting in hydrogen and in muonium have been used to measure the value of the fine-structure constant α. Comparison with measurements of α in other physical systems provides a stringent test of QED.

=== Qubit in ion-trap quantum computing ===
The hyperfine states of a trapped ion are commonly used for storing qubits in ion-trap quantum computing. They have the advantage of having very long lifetimes, experimentally exceeding ~10 minutes (compared to ~1 s for metastable electronic levels).

The frequency associated with the states' energy separation is in the microwave region, making it possible to drive hyperfine transitions using microwave radiation. However, at present no emitter is available that can be focused to address a particular ion from a sequence. Instead, a pair of laser pulses can be used to drive the transition, by having their frequency difference (detuning) equal to the required transition's frequency. This is essentially a stimulated Raman transition. In addition, near-field gradients have been exploited to individually address two ions separated by approximately 4.3 micrometers directly with microwave radiation.

== See also ==
- Dynamic nuclear polarization
- Electron paramagnetic resonance
