= Weiss magneton =

Unit of magnetic moment

The Weiss magneton was an experimentally derived unit of magnetic moment equal to 1.853×10^{−24} joules per tesla, which is about 20% of the Bohr magneton. It was suggested in 1911 by Pierre Weiss.

== Origin ==
The idea of elementary magnets originated from the Swiss physicist Walther Ritz, who tried to explain atomic spectra. In 1907 he suggested that atoms might contain chains of magnetized and neutral rods, which were the cause of magnetic properties of materials. Just like elementary charges, this was supposed to give rise to discrete values of the total magnetic moment per atom. In 1909, Weiss performed measurements of the saturation magnetization at the temperature of liquid hydrogen in the laboratory of Heike Kamerlingh Onnes in Leiden. In 1911, Weiss announced that the molar moments of nickel and iron had the ratio of 3:11, from which he derived the value of a magneton.

== Comparisons with early quantum theory ==
Weiss gave an address about the magneton at a conference in Karlsruhe in September 1911. Several theorists commented that the magneton should involve the Planck constant h. By postulating that the ratio of electron kinetic energy to orbital frequency should be equal to h, Richard Gans computed a value that was almost an order of magnitude larger than the value obtained by Weiss. At the First Solvay Conference in November that year, Paul Langevin obtained a submultiple which gave better agreement. But once the old quantum theory was a bit better understood, no theoretical argument could be found to justify Weiss's value. In 1920, Wolfgang Pauli wrote an article where he called the magneton of the experimentalists the Weiss magneton, and the theoretical value the Bohr magneton.

== Further experiments ==
Despite theoretical problems, Weiss and other experimentalists like Blas Cabrera continued to analyze data in terms of the Weiss magneton until the 1930s.
