= Fine-structure constant =

Quantifies strength of electromagnetic interaction

- Value: 0.0072973525643(11)

In physics, the fine-structure constant, also known as the Sommerfeld constant, commonly denoted by α (the Greek letter alpha), is a fundamental physical constant that quantifies the strength of the electromagnetic interaction between elementary charged particles.

It is a dimensionless quantity (dimensionless physical constant), independent of the system of units used, which is related to the strength of the coupling of an elementary charge e with the electromagnetic field, by the formula $\alpha = { e^2 }\left( 4 \pi \varepsilon_0 \hbar c \right)^{-1}$. Its numerical value is approximately 0.0072973525643 ≈ 137.035999177^{−1}, with a relative uncertainty of 1.6×10^{−10}. Historically, it was speculated to be exactly equal to 1/137, but it has since been shown to be slightly smaller.

The constant was named by Arnold Sommerfeld, who introduced it in 1916 when extending the Bohr model of the atom. $\alpha$ quantified the gap in the fine structure of the spectral lines of the hydrogen atom, which had been measured precisely by Albert A. Michelson and Edward W. Morley in 1887.

Why the constant should have this value is not understood, but there are a number of ways to measure its value (see precision tests of QED). The constant has likely been the same throughout time, as indicated by studies of the early universe and the Oklo natural nuclear fission reactor.

== Definition ==
In terms of other physical constants, $\alpha$ may be defined as:

$$\begin{align}
\alpha &= \frac{e^2}{2 \varepsilon_0 h c} = \frac{ e^2 }{ 4 \pi \varepsilon_0 \hbar c }\\
&= \frac{e^2\mu_0 c}{2 h} = \frac{ e^2 \mu_0 c}{ 4 \pi \hbar}\\
\end{align}$$

where

- e is the elementary charge (1.602176634×10^{−19} C);
- h is the Planck constant (6.62607015×10^{−34} J⋅Hz^{−1});
- ℏ is the reduced Planck constant, h/2π (1.054571817...×10^{−34} J⋅s);
- c is the speed of light (299792458 m⋅s^{−1});
- ε_{0} is the electrical permittivity of space (8.8541878188(14)×10^{−12} F⋅m^{−1});
- μ_{0} is the magnetic permeability of space (1.25663706127(20)×10^{−6} N⋅A^{−2}).

Since the 2019 revision of the SI, the only quantities on this list that do not have exact values in SI units are the electrical permittivity of space and magnetic permeability of space; the others are all defining constants.

=== Alternative systems of units ===
The electrostatic CGS system implicitly sets $4\pi\varepsilon_0 = 1$, as commonly found in older physics literature, where the expression of the fine-structure constant becomes
$$\alpha = \frac{e^2}{\ \hbar c\ } ~.$$

A normalised system of units commonly used in high energy physics selects artificial units for mass, distance, time, and electrical charge which cause $\varepsilon_0 = c = \hbar = 1$; in such a system of "natural units" the expression for the fine-structure constant becomes
$$\alpha = \frac{ e^2 }{\ 4 \pi\ } ~.$$
As such, the fine-structure constant is chiefly a quantity determining (or determined by) the elementary charge: $\ e = \sqrt{ 4\pi\alpha\; } \approx$ 0.30282212 in terms of such a natural unit of charge.

In the system of atomic units, which sets $e = \hbar = 4\pi\varepsilon_0 = 1$, the expression for the fine-structure constant becomes
$$\alpha = \frac{ 1 }{\ c\  } ~.$$

== Measurement ==
Eighth-order Feynman diagrams on electron self-interaction. The arrowed horizontal line represents the electron, the wavy lines are virtual photons, and the circles are virtual electron–positron pairs.

The CODATA recommended value of α is

α = e^{2}/ 4πε_{0}ħc = 0.0072973525643(11).

This has a relative standard uncertainty of 1.6×10^{−10}.

This value for α gives the following value for the vacuum magnetic permeability (magnetic constant): µ_{0} = 4π × 0.99999999987(16)×10^{−7} H⋅m^{−1}, with the mean differing from the old defined value by only 0.13 parts per billion, 0.8 times the standard uncertainty (0.16 parts per billion) of its recommended measured value.

Historically, the value of the reciprocal of the fine-structure constant is often given. The CODATA recommended value is

1/α = 137.035999177(21).

While the value of α can be determined from estimates of the constants that appear in any of its definitions, the theory of quantum electrodynamics (QED) provides a way to measure α directly using the quantum Hall effect or the anomalous magnetic moment of the electron. Other methods include the A.C. Josephson effect and photon recoil in atom interferometry. There is general agreement for the value of α, as measured by these different methods. The preferred methods in 2019 are measurements of electron anomalous magnetic moments and of photon recoil in atom interferometry. The theory of QED predicts a relationship between the dimensionless magnetic moment of the electron and the fine-structure constant α (the magnetic moment of the electron is also referred to as the electron g-factor g_{e}). One of the most precise values of α obtained experimentally (as of 2023) is based on a measurement of g_{e} using a one-electron so-called "quantum cyclotron" apparatus, together with a calculation via the theory of QED that involved 12672 tenth-order Feynman diagrams:

$\frac{ 1 }{ \alpha } =$ 137.035999166(15) .

This measurement of α has a relative standard uncertainty of 1.1×10^{−10}. This value and uncertainty are about the same as the latest experimental results.

Further refinement of the experimental value was published by the end of 2020, giving the value

1/α = 137.035999206(11),

with a relative accuracy of 8.1×10^{−11}, which has a significant discrepancy from the previous experimental value.

== Physical interpretations ==
The fine-structure constant, α, has several physical interpretations. α is:

- The ratio of two energies:
  1. the energy needed to overcome the electrostatic repulsion between two electrons a distance of d apart, and
  2. the energy of a single photon of wavelength λ = 2πd (or of angular wavelength d; see Planck relation):
    $$\alpha = \left. { \left( \frac{e^2}{4\pi \varepsilon_0 d} \right) }\right/ { \left( \frac{hc}{\lambda} \right) } = \frac{e^2}{4\pi\varepsilon_0 d } \times {\frac{ 2 \pi d }{hc}} = \frac{e^2}{ 4 \pi \varepsilon_0 d } \times {\frac{d}{ \hbar c }} = \frac{e^2}{ 4 \pi \varepsilon_0 \hbar c } .$$
- The ratio of the velocity of the electron in the first circular orbit of the Bohr model of the atom, which is 1/4πε_{0}e^{2}/ħ, to the speed of light in vacuum, c. This is Sommerfeld's original physical interpretation.
- $\ \alpha^2\$ is the ratio of the potential energy of the electron in the first circular orbit of the Bohr model of the atom and the energy m_{e}c^{2} equivalent to the mass of an electron. Using the virial theorem in the Bohr model of the atom $U_\mathsf{el} = 2 U_\mathsf{kin}$, which means that $U_\mathsf{el} = m_\mathsf{e} v_\mathsf{e}^2 = m_\mathsf{e} (\alpha c)^2 = \alpha^2 (m_\mathsf{e} c^2)$. Essentially this ratio follows from the electron's velocity being $v_\mathsf{e} = \alpha c$.
- The two ratios of three characteristic lengths: the classical electron radius r_{e}, the reduced Compton wavelength of the electron ƛ_{e}, and the Bohr radius a_{0}: r_{e} = αƛ_{e} = α^{2}a_{0}.
- In quantum electrodynamics, α is directly related to the coupling constant determining the strength of the interaction between electrons and photons. The theory does not predict its value. Therefore, α must be determined experimentally. In fact, α is one of the empirical parameters in the Standard Model of particle physics, whose value is not determined within the Standard Model.
- In the electroweak theory unifying the weak interaction with electromagnetism, α is absorbed into two other coupling constants associated with the electroweak gauge fields. In this theory, the electromagnetic interaction is treated as a mixture of interactions associated with the electroweak fields. The strength of the electromagnetic interaction varies with the strength of the energy field.
- In the fields of electrical engineering and solid-state physics, the fine-structure constant is one fourth the product of the characteristic impedance of free space, $\ Z_0 = \mu_0 c\ ,$ and the conductance quantum, $\ G_0 = 2 e^2 / h\ :$ $\ \alpha = \tfrac{ 1 }{\ 4\ } Z_0\ G_0 ~.$ The optical conductivity of graphene for visible frequencies is theoretically given by π/4G_{0}, and as a result its light absorption and transmission properties can be expressed in terms of the fine-structure constant alone. The absorption value for normal-incident light on graphene in vacuum would then be given by πα/( (1 + πα/2)^{2}) or 2.24%, and the transmission by 1/((1 + πα/2)^{2}) or 97.75% (experimentally observed to be between 97.6% and 97.8%). The reflection would then be given by (π^{2} α^{2})/( 4 (1 + πα/2)^{2}).
- The fine-structure constant gives the maximum positive charge of an atomic nucleus that will allow a stable electron-orbit around it within the Bohr model (element feynmanium). For an electron orbiting an atomic nucleus with atomic number Z the relation is mv^{2}/r = 1/ 4πε_{0} Ze^{2}/r^{2} . The Heisenberg uncertainty principle momentum/position uncertainty relationship of such an electron is just mvr = ħ. The relativistic limiting value for v is c, and so the limiting value for Z is the reciprocal of the fine-structure constant, 137.

When perturbation theory is applied to quantum electrodynamics, the resulting perturbative expansions for physical results are expressed as sets of power series in α. Because α is much less than one, higher powers of α are soon unimportant, making the perturbation theory practical in this case. On the other hand, the large value of the corresponding factors in quantum chromodynamics makes calculations involving the strong nuclear force extremely difficult.

== Variation with energy scale ==
In quantum electrodynamics, the more thorough quantum field theory underlying the electromagnetic coupling, the renormalization group dictates how the strength of the electromagnetic interaction grows logarithmically as the relevant energy scale increases. The value of the fine-structure constant α is linked to the observed value of this coupling associated with the energy scale of the electron mass: the electron's mass gives a lower bound for this energy scale, because it (and the positron) is the lightest charged object whose quantum loops can contribute to the running. Therefore, 1/ 137.03600 is the asymptotic value of the fine-structure constant at zero energy. At higher energies, such as the scale of the Z boson, about 90 GeV, one instead measures an effective α ≈ 1/127.

As the energy scale increases, the strength of the electromagnetic interaction in the Standard Model approaches that of the other two fundamental interactions, a feature important for grand unification theories. In perturbative quantum electrodynamics as a stand-alone theory, the coupling diverges at an energy known as the Landau pole – this fact undermines the consistency of quantum electrodynamics in perturbative expansions. However, non-perturbative numerical experiments suggest that instead the Landau pole becomes inaccessible at such energies and QED becomes trivial.

== History ==
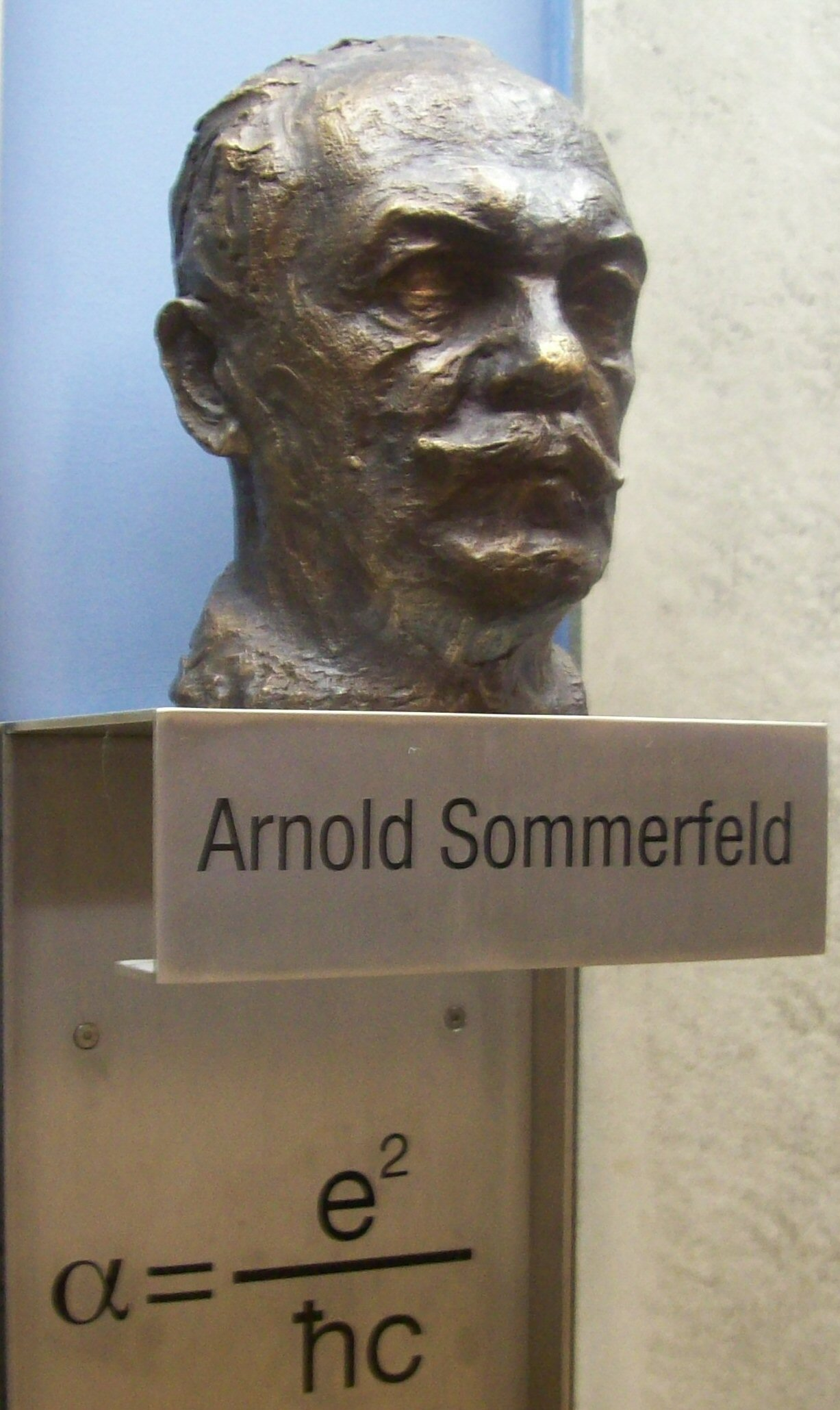
Sommerfeld memorial at LMU Munich

Based on the precise measurement of the hydrogen atom spectrum by Albert A. Michelson and Edward W. Morley in 1887, (Note: "Among other substances [that were] tried in the preliminary experiments, were thallium, lithium, and hydrogen. ... It may be noted, that in [the] case of the red hydrogen line, the interference phenomena disappeared at about 15,000 wave-lengths, and again at about 45,000 wave-lengths: So that the red hydrogen line must be a double line with the components about one-sixtieth as distant as the sodium lines.") Arnold Sommerfeld extended the Bohr model to include elliptical orbits and relativistic dependence of mass on velocity. He introduced a term for the fine-structure constant in 1916. (Note: "Wir fügen den Bohrschen Gleichungen (46) und (47) die charakteristische Konstante unserer Feinstrukturen (49) α = 2πe^{2}/ch hinzu, die zugleich mit der Kenntnis des Wasserstoffdubletts oder des Heliumtripletts in §10 oder irgend einer analogen Struktur bekannt ist." ——— (We add, to Bohr's equations (46) and (47), the characteristic constant of our fine structures (49) α = 2πe^{2}/ch which is known at once from knowledge of the hydrogen doublet or the helium triplet in §10 or any analogous structure.)) The first physical interpretation of the fine-structure constant α was as the ratio of the velocity of the electron in the first circular orbit of the relativistic Bohr atom to the speed of light in the vacuum. Equivalently, it was the quotient between the minimum angular momentum allowed by relativity for a closed orbit, and the minimum angular momentum allowed for it by quantum mechanics. It appears naturally in Sommerfeld's analysis, and determines the size of the splitting or fine structure of the hydrogenic spectral lines. This constant was not seen as significant until Paul Dirac's linear relativistic wave equation in 1928, which gave the exact fine structure formula.

With the development of quantum electrodynamics (QED) the significance of α has broadened from a spectroscopic phenomenon to a general coupling constant for the electromagnetic field, determining the strength of the interaction between electrons and photons. The term α/2π is engraved on the tombstone of one of the pioneers of QED, Julian Schwinger, referring to his calculation of the anomalous magnetic dipole moment.

=== History of measurements ===
Successive values determined for the fine-structure constant (Note: Numbers in parentheses (e.g. the "(11)" appearing at the end of the value "137.035999206(11)") give its standard uncertainty referred to the least significant preceding digit.)
Date	α	1/α	Sources
1969 Jul	0.007297351(11)	137.03602(21)	CODATA 1969
1973	0.0072973461(81)	137.03612(15)	CODATA 1973
1987 Jan	0.00729735308(33)	137.0359895(61)	CODATA 1986
1998	0.007297352582(27)	137.03599883(51)	Kinoshita
2000 Apr	0.007297352533(27)	137.03599976(50)	CODATA 1998
2002	0.007297352568(24)	137.03599911(46)	CODATA 2002
2007 Jul	0.0072973525700(52)	137.035999070(98)	Gabrielse (2007)
2008 Jun	0.0072973525376(50)	137.035999679(94)	CODATA 2006
2008 Jul	0.0072973525692(27)	137.035999084(51)	Gabrielse (2008), Hanneke (2008)
2010 Dec	0.0072973525717(48)	137.035999037(91)	Bouchendira (2010)
2011 Jun	0.0072973525698(24)	137.035999074(44)	CODATA 2010
2015 Jun	0.0072973525664(17)	137.035999139(31)	CODATA 2014
2017 Jul	0.0072973525657(18)	137.035999150(33)	Aoyama et al. (2017)
2018 Dec	0.0072973525713(14)	137.035999046(27)	Parker, Yu, et al. (2018)
2019 May	0.0072973525693(11)	137.035999084(21)	CODATA 2018
2020 Dec	0.0072973525628(6)	137.035999206(11)	Morel et al. (2020)
2022 Dec	0.0072973525643(11)	137.035999177(21)	CODATA 2022
2023 Feb	0.0072973525649(8)	137.035999166(15)	Fan et al. (2023) (Note: This is not an experimentally measured value; instead it is a value determined by the current theory from an experimentally determined value of the electron magnetic moment.)

The CODATA values in the above table are computed by averaging other measurements; they are not independent experiments.

== Potential variation over time ==
Physicists have pondered whether the fine-structure constant is in fact constant, or whether its value differs by location and over time. A varying α has been proposed as a way of solving problems in cosmology and astrophysics. String theory and other proposals for going beyond the Standard Model of particle physics have led to theoretical interest in whether the accepted physical constants (not just α) actually vary.

In the experiments below, Δα represents the change in α over time, which can be computed by α_{past} − α_{now} . If the fine-structure constant really is a constant, then any experiment should show that
$$\frac{\ \Delta \alpha\ }{\alpha} ~~ \overset{\underset{\mathsf{~def~}}{}}{=} ~~ \frac{\ \alpha _\mathsf{past} - \alpha _\mathsf{now}\ }{\alpha_\mathsf{now}} ~~=~~ 0 ~,$$
or as close to zero as experiment can measure. Any value far away from zero would indicate that α does change over time. So far, most experimental data is consistent with α being constant, up to 10 digits of accuracy.

=== Past rate of change ===
The first experimenters to test whether the fine-structure constant might actually vary examined the spectral lines of distant astronomical objects and the products of radioactive decay in the Oklo natural nuclear fission reactor. Their findings were consistent with no variation in the fine-structure constant between these two vastly separated locations and times. The most recent constraint from Oklo, from Davis & Hamdan (2015), set an upper limit of 11 ppb difference at 95% confidence level, a constraint comparable in strength to that from atomic-clock measurements.

Improved technology at the dawn of the 21st century made it possible to probe the value of α at much larger distances and to a much greater accuracy. In 1999, a team led by John K. Webb of the University of New South Wales claimed the first detection of a variation in α. Using the Keck telescopes and a data set of 128 quasars at redshifts 0.5 < z < 3, Webb et al. found that their spectra were consistent with a slight increase in α over the last 10–12 billion years. Specifically, they found that
$$\frac{\ \Delta \alpha\ }{\alpha} ~~ \overset{\underset{\mathsf{~def~}}{}}{=} ~~ \frac{\ \alpha _\mathrm{prev}-\alpha _\mathrm{now}\ }{\alpha_\mathrm{now}} ~~=~~  \left(-5.7\pm 1.0 \right) \times 10^{-6} ~.$$

In other words, they measured the value to be somewhere between −0.0000047 and −0.0000067. This is a very small value, but the error bars do not actually include zero. This result either indicates that α is not constant or that there is experimental error unaccounted for.

In 2004, a smaller study of 23 absorption systems by Chand et al., using the Very Large Telescope, found no measurable variation:
$$\frac{\Delta \alpha}{\alpha_\mathrm{em}}\ =\ \left(-0.6\pm 0.6\right) \times 10^{-6} ~.$$

However, in 2007 simple flaws were identified in the analysis method of Chand et al., discrediting those results.

King et al. have used Markov chain Monte Carlo methods to investigate the algorithm used by the UNSW group to determine Δα/ α from the quasar spectra, and have found that the algorithm appears to produce correct uncertainties and maximum likelihood estimates for Δα/ α for particular models. This suggests that the statistical uncertainties and best estimate for Δα/ α stated by Webb et al. and Murphy et al. are robust.

In 2007, Khatri and Wandelt of the University of Illinois at Urbana-Champaign realized that the 21 cm hyperfine transition in neutral hydrogen of the early universe leaves a unique absorption line imprint in the cosmic microwave background radiation. They proposed using this effect to measure the value of α during the epoch before the formation of the first stars. In principle, this technique provides enough information to measure a variation of 1 part in 10^{9} (4 orders of magnitude better than the current quasar constraints). However, the constraint which can be placed on α is strongly dependent upon effective integration time, going as 1/√t . The European LOFAR radio telescope would only be able to constrain Δα/ α to about 0.3%. The collecting area required to constrain Δα/ α to the current level of quasar constraints is on the order of 100 square kilometers, which is economically impracticable at present.

=== Present rate of change ===
In 2008, Rosenband et al. used the frequency ratio of Al^{+} and Hg^{+} in single-ion optical atomic clocks to place a very stringent constraint on the present-time temporal variation of α, namely Δα/ α = (−1.6±2.3)×10^{−17} per year. A present day null constraint on the time variation of alpha does not necessarily rule out time variation in the past. Indeed, some theories that predict a variable fine-structure constant also predict that the value of the fine-structure constant should become practically fixed in its value once the universe enters its current dark energy-dominated epoch.

== Spatial variation ==
Measuring the tiny spatial variation of the fine-structure constant with astronomical observations is a challenging project. In 2011, evidence for spatial variation across the observable universe was obtained by reanalyzing an existing spectroscopy data set. A second set of measurements confirmed some effect, at the level of a few part per million with a large uncertainty, (2±7)×10^{−5}. Subsequent and more sophisticated analysis found no variation down the parts per million level.

== Anthropic explanation ==
The anthropic principle provides an argument as to the reason the fine-structure constant has the value it does: stable matter, and therefore life and intelligent beings, could not exist if its value were very different. For instance, if modern grand unified theories are correct, then α needs to be between around 1/180 and 1/85 to have proton decay to be slow enough for life to be possible.

In the late 20th century, multiple physicists, including Stephen Hawking in his 1988 book A Brief History of Time, began exploring the idea of a multiverse, and the fine-structure constant was one of several universal constants that suggested the idea of a fine-tuned universe.

== Numerological explanations ==
As a dimensionless constant which does not seem to be directly related to any mathematical constant, the fine-structure constant has long fascinated physicists.

Arthur Eddington argued that the value could be "obtained by pure deduction" and he related it to the Eddington number, his estimate of the number of protons in the universe. This led him in 1929 to conjecture that the reciprocal of the fine-structure constant was not approximately but precisely the integer 137. By the 1940s experimental values for 1/ α deviated sufficiently from 137 to refute Eddington's arguments.

Physicist Wolfgang Pauli commented on the appearance of certain numbers in physics, including the fine-structure constant, which he also noted approximates reciprocal of the prime number 137. This constant so intrigued him that he collaborated with psychoanalyst Carl Jung in a quest to understand its significance. Similarly, Max Born believed that if the value of α was larger, then it would not be possible to distinguish matter from ether, and thus that α = 1/137 is a law of nature. (Note: "If alpha were bigger than it really is, we should not be able to distinguish matter from ether [the vacuum, nothingness], and our task to disentangle the natural laws would be hopelessly difficult. The fact however that alpha has just its value 1/137 is certainly no chance but itself a law of nature. It is clear that the explanation of this number must be the central problem of natural philosophy." – Max Born)

Richard Feynman, one of the originators and early developers of the theory of quantum electrodynamics (QED), referred to the fine-structure constant in these terms:

There is a most profound and beautiful question associated with the observed coupling constant, e – the amplitude for a real electron to emit or absorb a real photon. It is a simple number that has been experimentally determined to be close to 0.08542455. (My physicist friends won't recognize this number, because they like to remember it as the inverse of its square: about 137.03597 with an uncertainty of about 2 in the last decimal place. It has been a mystery ever since it was discovered more than fifty years ago, and all good theoretical physicists put this number up on their wall and worry about it.)

Immediately you would like to know where this number for a coupling comes from: is it related to pi or perhaps to the base of natural logarithms? Nobody knows. It's one of the greatest damn mysteries of physics: a magic number that comes to us with no understanding by humans. You might say the "hand of God" wrote that number, and "we don't know how He pushed His pencil." We know what kind of a dance to do experimentally to measure this number very accurately, but we don't know what kind of dance to do on the computer to make this number come out – without putting it in secretly!

— R. P. Feynman

Conversely, statistician I. J. Good argued that a numerological explanation would only be acceptable if it could be based on a good theory that is not yet known but "exists" in the sense of a Platonic Ideal. (Note: "There have been a few examples of numerology that have led to theories that transformed society: See the mention of Kirchhoff and Balmer in Good (1962) p. 316 ... and one can well include Kepler on account of his third law. It would be fair enough to say that numerology was the origin of the theories of electromagnetism, quantum mechanics, gravitation. ... So I intend no disparagement when I describe a formula as numerological. When a numerological formula is proposed, then we may ask whether it is correct. ... I think an appropriate definition of correctness is that the formula has a good explanation, in a Platonic sense, that is, the explanation could be based on a good theory that is not yet known but 'exists' in the universe of possible reasonable ideas." — I. J. Good (1990))

Attempts to find a mathematical basis for this dimensionless constant have continued up to the present time. However, no numerological explanation has ever been accepted by the physics community.

== Quotes ==
For historical reasons, α is known as the fine structure constant. Unfortunately, this name conveys a false impression. We have seen that the charge of an electron is not strictly constant but varies with distance because of quantum effects; hence α must be regarded as a variable, too. The value 1/ 137 is the asymptotic value of α shown in Fig. 1.5a.

— F. Halzen & A. Martin (1984)

The mystery about α is actually a double mystery: The first mystery – the origin of its numerical value α ≈ 1/ 137 – has been recognized and discussed for decades. The second mystery – the range of its domain – is generally unrecognized.

— M.H. MacGregor (2007)

When I die my first question to the Devil will be: What is the meaning of the fine structure constant?

— Wolfgang Pauli

== See also ==
- Dimensionless physical constant
- Hyperfine structure
