= Electron magnetic moment =

Spin of an electron

In atomic physics, the electron magnetic moment, or more specifically the electron magnetic dipole moment, is the magnetic moment of an electron resulting from its intrinsic properties of spin and electric charge. The value of the electron magnetic moment (symbol μ_{e}) is −9.2847646917(29)×10^{−24} J⋅T^{−1}. In units of the Bohr magneton (μ_{B}), it is −1.00115965218046(18), which has a relative uncertainty of 1.8×10^{−13}.

== Magnetic moment of an electron ==
The electron is a charged particle with charge −e, where e is the unit of elementary charge. Its angular momentum comes from two types of rotation: spin and orbital motion. From classical electrodynamics, a rotating distribution of electric charge produces a magnetic dipole, so that it behaves like a tiny bar magnet. One consequence is that an external magnetic field exerts a torque on the electron magnetic moment that depends on the orientation of this dipole with respect to the field.

If the electron is visualized as a classical rigid body in which the mass and charge have identical distribution and motion that is rotating about an axis with angular momentum L, its magnetic dipole moment μ is given by:
$$\boldsymbol{\mu} = -\frac{-e}{2m_\text{e}}\,\mathbf{L}\,,$$
where m_{e} is the electron rest mass. The angular momentum L in this equation may be the spin angular momentum, the orbital angular momentum, or the total angular momentum. The ratio between the true spin magnetic moment and that predicted by this model is a dimensionless factor g_{e}, known as the electron g-factor:
$$\boldsymbol{\mu} = -g_\text{e}\,\frac{(-e)}{~2m_\text{e}~}\,\mathbf{L}\,.$$

It is usual to express the magnetic moment in terms of the reduced Planck constant ħ and the Bohr magneton μ_{B}:
$$\boldsymbol{\mu} = g_\text{e}\,\mu_\text{B}\,\frac{\mathbf{L}}{\hbar}\,.$$

=== Formal definition ===
Classical notions such as the center of charge and mass are, however, hard to make precise for a quantum elementary particle. In practice the definition used by experimentalists comes from the form factors $F_i(q^2)$ appearing in the matrix element
$$\langle p_f | j^\mu | p_i \rangle = \bar u(p_f) \left[ F_1(q^2) \gamma^\mu +\frac{~i \sigma^{\mu\nu}~}{~2\,m_\text{e}~} q_\nu F_2(q^2) + i\epsilon^{\mu\nu\rho\sigma} \sigma_{\rho\sigma} q_\nu F_3(q^2) + \frac{1}{~2\,m_\text{e}~}\left(q^\mu-\frac{q^2}{2m} \gamma^\mu \right)\gamma_5 F_4(q^2) \right] u(p_i)$$
of the electromagnetic current operator between two on-shell states. Here $u(p_i)$ and $\bar u(p_f)$ are 4-spinor solution of the Dirac equation normalized so that $\bar u u = 2m_\text{e}$, and $q^\mu=p^\mu_f-p^\mu_i$ is the momentum transfer from the current to the electron. The $q^2 = 0$ form factor $F_1(0) = -e$ is the electron's charge, $\mu = \frac{1}{2m_\text{e}}(F_1(0)+F_2(0))$ is its static magnetic dipole moment, and $-\frac{1}{2m_\text{e}} F_3(0)$ provides the formal definion of the electron's electric dipole moment. The remaining form factor $F_4(q^2)$ would, if non zero, be the anapole moment.

=== Spin magnetic dipole moment ===
The spin magnetic moment is intrinsic for an electron. It is
$$\boldsymbol{\mu}_\text{s} = -g_\text{s}\,\mu_\text{B}\,\frac{~\mathbf{S}~}{\hbar}\,.$$

Here S is the electron spin angular momentum. The electron spin g-factor is approximately two: $g_\text{s} \approx 2$. (It is defined to be positive despite the electron g-factor, $g_\text{e}$, being negative). The factor of two indicates that the electron appears to be twice as effective in producing a magnetic moment as a charged body for which the mass and charge distributions are identical.

The spin magnetic dipole moment is approximately one μ_{B} because $g_\text{s} \approx 2$ and the electron is a spin-1/2 particle (S = ħ/2):

The z component of the electron magnetic moment is
$$(\boldsymbol{\mu}_\text{s})_z = -g_\text{s}\,\mu_\text{B}\,m_\text{s}\,,$$
where m_{s} is the spin quantum number. Note that μ is a negative constant multiplied by the spin, so the magnetic moment is antiparallel to the spin angular momentum.

The spin g-factor g_{s} = 2 comes from the Dirac equation, a fundamental equation connecting the electron's spin with its electromagnetic properties. Reduction of the Dirac equation for an electron in a magnetic field to its non-relativistic limit yields the Schrödinger equation with a correction term, which takes account of the interaction of the electron's intrinsic magnetic moment with the magnetic field giving the correct energy.

For the electron spin, the most accurate value for the spin g-factor has been experimentally determined to have the value

−2.00231930436092(36).

Note that this differs only marginally from the value from the Dirac equation. The small correction is known as the anomalous magnetic dipole moment of the electron; it arises from the electron's interaction with virtual photons in quantum electrodynamics. A triumph of the quantum electrodynamics theory is the accurate prediction of the electron g-factor. The CODATA value for the electron magnetic moment is

−9.2847646917(29)×10^{−24} J⋅T^{−1}.

=== Orbital magnetic dipole moment ===
The revolution of an electron around an axis through another object, such as the nucleus, gives rise to the orbital magnetic dipole moment. Suppose that the angular momentum for the orbital motion is L. Then the orbital magnetic dipole moment is
$$\boldsymbol{\mu}_L = -g_\text{L}\,\mu_\text{B}\,\frac{~\mathbf{L}~}{\hbar}\,.$$

Here g_{L} is the electron orbital g-factor and μ_{B} is the Bohr magneton. The value of g_{L} is exactly equal to one, by a quantum-mechanical argument analogous to the derivation of the classical gyromagnetic ratio.

=== Total magnetic dipole moment ===
The total magnetic dipole moment resulting from both spin and orbital angular momenta of an electron is related to the total angular momentum J by a similar equation:
$$\boldsymbol{\mu}_\text{J} = -g_\text{J}\,\mu_\text{B}\,\frac{~\mathbf{J}~}{\hbar}\,.$$

The g-factor g_{J} is known as the Landé g-factor, which can be related to g_{L} and g_{S} by quantum mechanics. See Landé g-factor for details.

== Example: hydrogen atom ==
For a hydrogen atom, an electron occupying the atomic orbital Ψ_{n,ℓ,m}, the magnetic dipole moment is given by
$$\mu_\text{L} = -g_\text{L} \frac{\mu_\text{B}}{\hbar}\langle\Psi_{n,\ell,m}|L|\Psi_{n,\ell,m}\rangle = -\mu_\text{B}\sqrt{\ell(\ell + 1)}.$$

Here L is the orbital angular momentum, n, ℓ, and m are the principal, azimuthal, and magnetic quantum numbers respectively. The z component of the orbital magnetic dipole moment for an electron with a magnetic quantum number m_{ℓ} is given by
$$(\boldsymbol{\mu}_\text{L})_z = -\mu_\text{B} m_\ell.$$

== History ==
The electron magnetic moment is intrinsically connected to electron spin and was first hypothesized during the early models of the atom in the early twentieth century. The first to introduce the idea of electron spin was Arthur Compton in his 1921 paper on investigations of ferromagnetic substances with X-rays. In Compton's article, he wrote: "Perhaps the most natural, and certainly the most generally accepted view of the nature of the elementary magnet, is that the revolution of electrons in orbits within the atom give to the atom as a whole the properties of a tiny permanent magnet."

That same year Otto Stern proposed an experiment carried out later called the Stern–Gerlach experiment in which silver atoms in a magnetic field were deflected in opposite directions of distribution. This pre-1925 period marked the old quantum theory built upon the Bohr-Sommerfeld model of the atom with its classical elliptical electron orbits. During the period between 1916 and 1925, much progress was being made concerning the arrangement of electrons in the periodic table. In order to explain the Zeeman effect in the Bohr atom, Sommerfeld proposed that electrons would be based on three 'quantum numbers', n, k, and m, that described the size of the orbit, the shape of the orbit, and the direction in which the orbit was pointing. Irving Langmuir had explained in his 1919 paper regarding electrons in their shells, "Rydberg has pointed out that these numbers are obtained from the series $N = 2(1 + 2^2 + 2^2 + 3^2 + 3^2 + 4^2)$. The factor two suggests a fundamental two-fold symmetry for all stable atoms." This $2n^2$ configuration was adopted by Edmund Stoner, in October 1924 in his paper 'The Distribution of Electrons Among Atomic Levels' published in the Philosophical Magazine. Wolfgang Pauli hypothesized that this required a fourth quantum number with one of two values.

== Electron spin in the Pauli and Dirac theories ==
Starting from here the charge of the electron is e < 0. The necessity of introducing half-integral spin goes back experimentally to the results of the Stern–Gerlach experiment. A beam of atoms is run through a strong non-uniform magnetic field, which then splits into N parts depending on the intrinsic angular momentum of the atoms. It was found that for silver atoms, the beam was split in two—the ground state therefore could not be integral, because even if the intrinsic angular momentum of the atoms were as small as possible, 1, the beam would be split into 3 parts, corresponding to atoms with L_{z} = −1, 0, and +1. The conclusion is that silver atoms have net intrinsic angular momentum of 1/2. Pauli set up a theory which explained this splitting by introducing a two-component wave function and a corresponding correction term in the Hamiltonian, representing a semi-classical coupling of this wave function to an applied magnetic field, as so:
$$H = \frac{1}{2m} \left [ \boldsymbol{\sigma}\cdot \left ( \mathbf{p} - \frac{e}{c}\mathbf{A} \right ) \right ]^2 + e\phi.$$

Here A is the magnetic vector potential and ϕ the electric potential, both representing the electromagnetic field, and σ = (σ_{x}, σ_{y}, σ_{z}) are the Pauli matrices. On squaring out the first term, a residual interaction with the magnetic field is found, along with the usual classical Hamiltonian of a charged particle interacting with an applied field:
$$H = \frac{1}{2m}\left ( \mathbf{p} - \frac{e}{c}\mathbf{A} \right )^2 + e\phi - \frac{e\hbar}{2mc} \boldsymbol{\sigma} \cdot \mathbf{B}.$$

This Hamiltonian is now a 2 × 2 matrix, so the Schrödinger equation based on it must use a two-component wave function. Pauli had introduced the 2 × 2 sigma matrices as pure phenomenology — Dirac now had a theoretical argument that implied that spin was somehow the consequence of incorporating relativity into quantum mechanics. On introducing the external electromagnetic 4-potential into the Dirac equation in a similar way, known as minimal coupling, it takes the form (in natural units ħ = c = 1)
$$\left [ -i\gamma^\mu\left ( \partial_\mu + i e A_\mu \right ) + m \right ] \psi = 0$$
where $\gamma^\mu$ are the gamma matrices (known as Dirac matrices) and i is the imaginary unit. A second application of the Dirac operator will now reproduce the Pauli term exactly as before, because the spatial Dirac matrices multiplied by i, have the same squaring and commutation properties as the Pauli matrices. What is more, the value of the gyromagnetic ratio of the electron, standing in front of Pauli's new term, is explained from first principles. This was a major achievement of the Dirac equation and gave physicists great faith in its overall correctness. The Pauli theory may be seen as the low energy limit of the Dirac theory in the following manner. First the equation is written in the form of coupled equations for 2-spinors with the units restored:
$$\begin{pmatrix}
(mc^2 - E + e \phi) & c\sigma\cdot \left (\mathbf{p} - \frac{e}{c}\mathbf{A} \right ) \\ -c\boldsymbol{\sigma}\cdot \left ( \mathbf{p} - \frac{e}{c}\mathbf{A} \right ) & \left ( mc^2 + E - e \phi \right )
\end{pmatrix}
\begin{pmatrix} \psi_+ \\ \psi_- \end{pmatrix}
=
\begin{pmatrix} 0 \\ 0 \end{pmatrix}.$$
so
$$\begin{align}
(E - e\phi) \psi_+ - c\boldsymbol{\sigma} \cdot \left( \mathbf{p} - \frac{e}{c}\mathbf{A} \right) \psi_- &= mc^2 \psi_+ \\
-(E - e\phi) \psi_- + c\boldsymbol{\sigma} \cdot \left( \mathbf{p} - \frac{e}{c}\mathbf{A} \right) \psi_+ &= mc^2 \psi_-
\end{align}$$

Assuming the field is weak and the motion of the electron non-relativistic, we have the total energy of the electron approximately equal to its rest energy, and the momentum reducing to the classical value,
$$\begin{align}
E - e\phi &\approx mc^2 \\
p &\approx m v
\end{align}$$
and so the second equation may be written
$$\psi_- \approx \frac{1}{2mc} \boldsymbol{\sigma} \cdot \left( \mathbf{p} - \frac{e}{c}\mathbf{A} \right) \psi_+$$
which is of order v/c - thus at typical energies and velocities, the bottom components of the Dirac spinor in the standard representation are much suppressed in comparison to the top components. Substituting this expression into the first equation gives after some rearrangement
$$\left(E - mc^2\right) \psi_+ = \frac{1}{2m} \left[ \boldsymbol{\sigma}\cdot \left( \mathbf{p} - \frac{e}{c} \mathbf{A} \right) \right]^2 \psi_+ + e\phi \psi_+$$

The operator on the left represents the particle energy reduced by its rest energy, which is just the classical energy, so we recover Pauli's theory if we identify his 2-spinor with the top components of the Dirac spinor in the non-relativistic approximation. A further approximation gives the Schrödinger equation as the limit of the Pauli theory. Thus the Schrödinger equation may be seen as the far non-relativistic approximation of the Dirac equation when one may neglect spin and work only at low energies and velocities. This also was a great triumph for the new equation, as it traced the mysterious i that appears in it, and the necessity of a complex wave function, back to the geometry of space-time through the Dirac algebra. It also highlights why the Schrödinger equation, although superficially in the form of a diffusion equation, actually represents the propagation of waves.

It should be strongly emphasized that this separation of the Dirac spinor into large and small components depends explicitly on a low-energy approximation. The entire Dirac spinor represents an irreducible whole, and the components we have just neglected to arrive at the Pauli theory will bring in new phenomena in the relativistic regime – antimatter and the idea of creation and annihilation of particles.

In a general case (if a certain linear function of electromagnetic field does not vanish identically), three out of four components of the spinor function in the Dirac equation can be algebraically eliminated, yielding an equivalent fourth-order partial differential equation for just one component. Furthermore, this remaining component can be made real by a gauge transform.

== Measurement ==
The existence of the anomalous magnetic moment of the electron has been detected experimentally by magnetic resonance method. This allows the determination of hyperfine splitting of electron shell energy levels in atoms of protium and deuterium using the measured resonance frequency for several transitions.

The magnetic moment of the electron has been measured using a one-electron quantum cyclotron and quantum nondemolition spectroscopy. The spin frequency of the electron is determined by the g-factor.
$$\nu_\text{s} = \frac{g}{2} \nu_c$$
$$\frac{g}{2} = \frac{\bar{\nu}_c + \bar{\nu}_a}{\bar{\nu}_c}$$

== See also ==
- Spin (physics)
- Electron precipitation
- Bohr magneton
- Nuclear magnetic moment
- Nucleon magnetic moment
- Anomalous magnetic dipole moment
- Electron electric dipole moment
- Fine structure
- Hyperfine structure

== Bibliography ==
- Sergei Vonsovsky (1975). Magnetism of Elementary Particles. Mir Publishers.
- Sin-Itiro Tomonaga (1997). The Story of Spin. University of Chicago Press.
- Fan, X.; Myers, T. G.; Sukra, B. A. D.; Gabrielse, G. (2023-02-13). "Measurement of the Electron Magnetic Moment". Physical Review Letters. 130 (7) 071801. arXiv:2209.13084. Bibcode:2023PhRvL.130g1801F. doi:10.1103/PhysRevLett.130.071801. PMID 36867820.
