= G-factor (physics) =

Ratio of magnetic moment and angular momentum

A g-factor (also called g value) is a dimensionless quantity that characterizes the magnetic moment and angular momentum of a whole atom, a particle, or a nucleus. It is the ratio of the magnetic moment (or, equivalently, the gyromagnetic ratio) of a particle to that expected of a classical particle of the same charge and angular momentum. In nuclear physics, the nuclear magneton replaces the classically expected magnetic moment (or gyromagnetic ratio) in the definition. The two definitions coincide for the proton.

Because the g-factor can be measured very precisely, and also calculated very precisely from theoretical models, small discrepancies in particles' measured and predicted g-factors are used as tests for theories in particle physics, in particular the Standard Model.

== Definition ==
=== Dirac particle ===
The spin magnetic moment of a charged, spin 1/2 particle that does not possess any internal structure (a Dirac particle) is given by
$$\boldsymbol \mu\ =\ g\ \frac{ e }{\ 2\ m\ }\ \mathbf S\ ,$$
where μ is the spin magnetic moment of the particle, g is the g-factor of the particle, e is the elementary charge, m is the mass of the particle, and S is the spin angular momentum of the particle (with magnitude ħ/2 for Dirac particles).

=== Baryon or nucleus ===
Protons, neutrons, nuclei, and other composite baryonic particles have magnetic moments arising from their spin (both the spin and magnetic moment may be zero, in which case the g-factor is undefined). Conventionally, the associated g-factors are defined using the nuclear magneton, and thus implicitly using the proton's mass rather than the particle's mass as for a Dirac particle. The formula used under this convention is
$$\boldsymbol{\mu}\ =\ g\ \frac{ \mu_\mathsf{N} }{ \hbar\ }\ \mathbf{I}\ =\ g\ \frac{ e }{\ 2\ m_\mathsf{p}\ }\ \mathbf{I}\ ,$$
where μ is the magnetic moment of the nucleon or nucleus resulting from its spin, g is the effective g-factor, I is its spin angular momentum, μ_{N} is the nuclear magneton, e is the elementary charge, and m_{p} is the proton rest mass.

== Calculation ==
=== Electron g-factors ===
There are three magnetic moments associated with an electron: One from its spin angular momentum, one from its orbital angular momentum, and one from its total angular momentum (the quantum-mechanical sum of those two components). Corresponding to these three moments are three different g-factors.

==== Electron spin g-factor ====
The electron spin g-factor, g_{e}, defined by
$$\boldsymbol{\mu}_\mathsf{s}\ =\ g_\mathsf{e} \frac{\ \mu_\mathsf{B}\ }{ \hbar }\ \mathbf{S}\ ,$$
where μ_{s} is the magnetic moment resulting from the spin of an electron, S is its spin angular momentum, and μ_{B} = (e ħ)/(2 m_{e}) is the Bohr magneton.

The value g_{e} is almost equal to −2. The reason it is not precisely −2 is explained by quantum electrodynamics calculation of the anomalous magnetic dipole moment. The measured value, −2.00231930436092(36) is known to extraordinary precision – one part in 10^{13}.

==== Positive electron g-factors ====
In atomic physics, the electron spin g-factor is often defined with a positive sign and the negative sign is included in the relationship between the g-factor and the z component of the magnetic moment:
$$\mu_\mathsf{z} = -g_\mathsf{s}\ \mu_\mathsf{B}\ m_\mathsf{s}\ ,$$
where $\ \hbar\ m_\mathsf{s}\$ are the eigenvalues of the S_{z} operator, meaning that m_{s} can take on values ±1/2. This convention has issues in complex cases and has not been adopted by the CODATA standard.

==== Electron orbital g-factor ====
Secondly, the electron orbital g-factor g_{L} is defined by
$$\boldsymbol{\mu}_L = -g_L\ \frac{\ \mu_\mathsf{B}\ }{ \hbar }\ \mathbf{L}\ ,$$
where μ_{L} is the magnetic moment resulting from the orbital angular momentum of an electron, L is its orbital angular momentum, and μ_{B} is the Bohr magneton. For an infinite-mass nucleus, the value of g_{L} is exactly equal to one, by a quantum-mechanical argument analogous to the derivation of the classical magnetogyric ratio. For an electron in an orbital with a magnetic quantum number m_{ℓ}, the z component of the orbital magnetic moment is
$$\mu_z = -g_L\ \mu_\text{B}\ m_\ell\ .$$
Since g_{L} = 1, the result is −μ_{B} m_{ℓ} .

For a finite-mass nucleus, there is an effective g value
$$g_L = 1 - \frac{1}{\ M\ }\ ,$$
where M is the ratio of the nuclear mass to the electron mass.

==== Total angular momentum (Landé) g-factor ====
Thirdly, the Landé g-factor g_{J} is defined by
$$|\boldsymbol{\mu}_J| = g_J \frac{\mu_\text{B}}{\hbar} |\mathbf{J}|,$$
where μ_{J} is the total magnetic moment resulting from both spin and orbital angular momentum of an electron, J = L + S, is its total angular momentum, and μ_{B} is the Bohr magneton. The value of g_{J} is related to g_{L} and g_{s} by a quantum-mechanical argument; see Landé g-factor. μ_{J} and J vectors are not collinear, so only their magnitudes can be compared.

=== Muon g-factor ===
If supersymmetry is realized in nature, there will be corrections to g−2 of the muon due to loop diagrams involving the new particles. Amongst the leading corrections are those depicted here: a neutralino and a smuon loop, and a chargino and a muon sneutrino loop. This represents an example of "beyond the Standard Model" physics that might contribute to g–2.

The muon, like the electron, has a g-factor associated with its spin, given by the equation
$$\boldsymbol \mu = g\ \frac{ e }{\ 2\ m_\mu\ }\ \mathbf{S}\ ,$$
where μ is the magnetic moment resulting from the muon's spin, S is the spin angular momentum, and m_{μ} is the muon mass.

That the muon g-factor is not quite the same as the electron g-factor is mostly explained by quantum electrodynamics and its calculation of the anomalous magnetic dipole moment. Almost all of the small difference between the two values (99.96% of it) is due to a well-understood lack of heavy-particle diagrams contributing to the probability for emission of a photon representing the magnetic dipole field, which are present for muons, but not electrons, in QED theory. These are entirely a result of the mass difference between the particles.

However, not all of the difference between the g-factors for electrons and muons is exactly explained by the Standard Model. The muon g-factor can, in theory, be affected by physics beyond the Standard Model, so it has been measured very precisely, in particular at the Brookhaven National Laboratory. In the E821 collaboration final report in November 2006, the experimental measured value is −2.0023318416(13), compared to the theoretical prediction of −2.00233183620(86). This is a difference of 3.4 standard deviations, suggesting that beyond-the-Standard-Model physics may be a contributory factor. The Brookhaven muon storage ring was transported to Fermilab where the Muon g–2 experiment used it to make more precise measurements of muon g-factor. On April 7, 2021, the Fermilab Muon g−2 collaboration presented and published a new measurement of the muon magnetic anomaly. When the Brookhaven and Fermilab measurements are combined, the new world average differs from the theory prediction by 4.2 standard deviations.

== Sign conventions ==
The g-factors typically represent a linear relationship between a magnetic moment and an angular momentum. In particle physics and nuclear magnetic resonance, a positive g-factor means the magnetic moment and angular momentum point are parallel; a negative g-factor means anti-parallel. However, in electron spin resonance anti-parallel orientation is assigned a positive value. The sign convention is important in cases where multiple moments are present in a single problem, for example in high resolution Zeeman effect studies of molecules. The negative-means-antiparallel convention has been adopted by the CODATA standard organization.

== Recommended g-factor values ==
CODATA recommended g-factor values
Particle	Symbol	g-factor	Relative standard uncertainty
electron	g_{e}	−2.00231930436092(36)	1.8×10^{−13}
muon	g_{μ}	−2.00233184123(82)	4.1×10^{−10}
proton	g_{p}	+5.5856946893(16)	2.9×10^{−10}
neutron	g_{n}	−3.82608552(90)	2.4×10^{−7}

The electron g-factor is one of the most precisely measured values in physics.

== See also ==
- Anomalous magnetic dipole moment
- Electron magnetic moment
- Landé g-factor
