= Muon g-2 =

Particle physics experiment

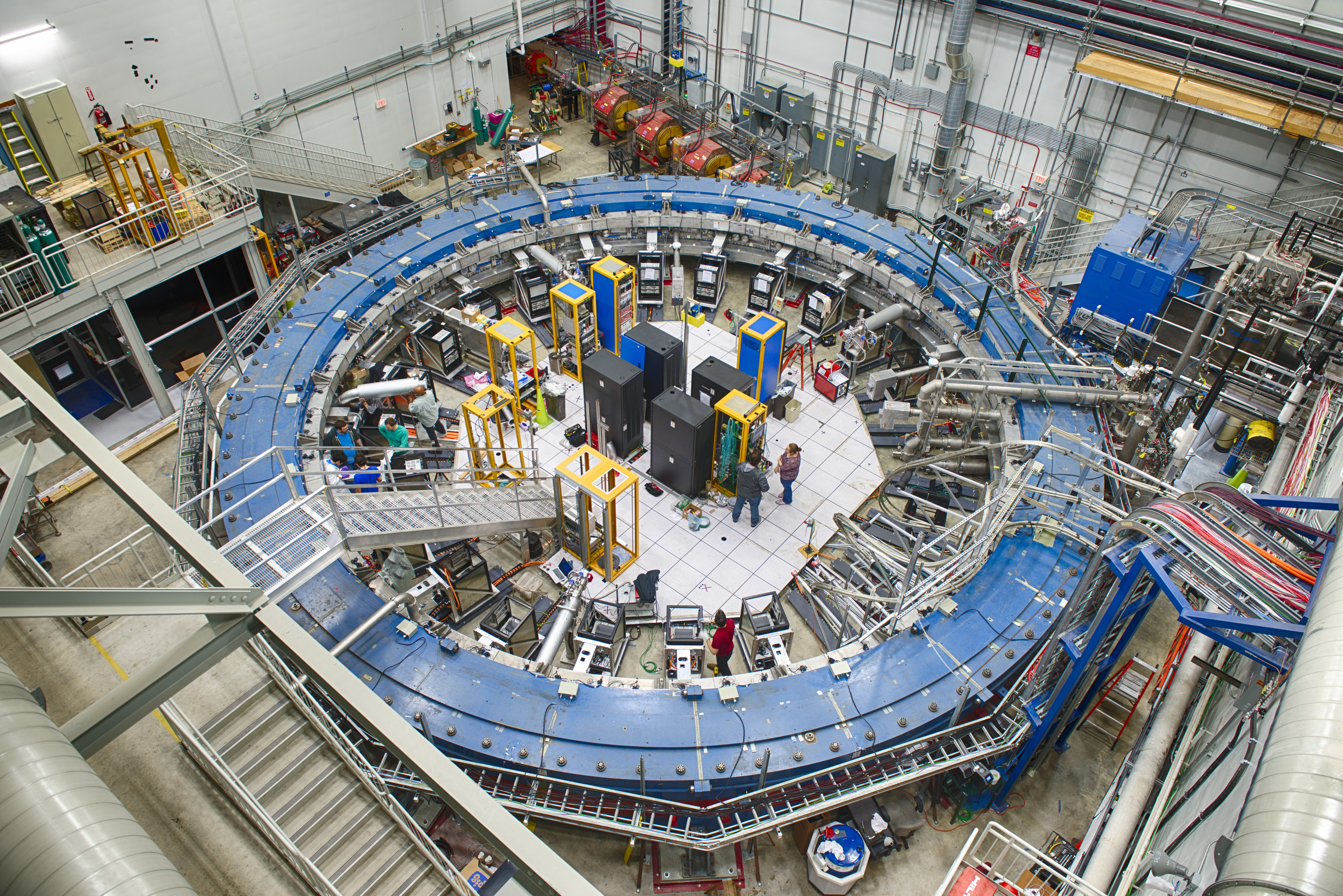
The g − 2 storage-ring magnet at Fermilab, which was originally designed for the Brookhaven g − 2 experiment. The geometry allows for a very uniform magnetic field to be established in the ring.

Muon g − 2 (pronounced "gee minus two") was a particle physics experiment at Fermilab to measure the anomalous magnetic dipole moment of a muon to a precision of 0.14 ppm. The value is a sensitive test of the Standard Model.

Significant deviation of measured value from theoretical predictions has been observed since late 1990s, making it a subject of high interest in high energy physics as it could indicate contributions to the theoretical value from beyond standard model that could also provide evidence of the existence of new particles. However, utilization of modern lattice QCD techniques in data-driven hadron vacuum polarization calculations since 2020 have resulted in updated contribution to the value, changing theoretical predictions significantly and lowering its standard deviation from the measurement, with latest claim of 0.5 sigma as of April 2026.

On July 9, 2023 the Fermilab collaboration concluded the experiment after six years of data collection. The initial results (based on data from the first year of the experiment's operation) were released on April 7, 2021. The results from the first three years of data-taking were announced in August 2023. The final results, based on the full six years of data-taking, were published on June 3, 2025.

== Timeline ==
=== Muon g − 2 at CERN ===
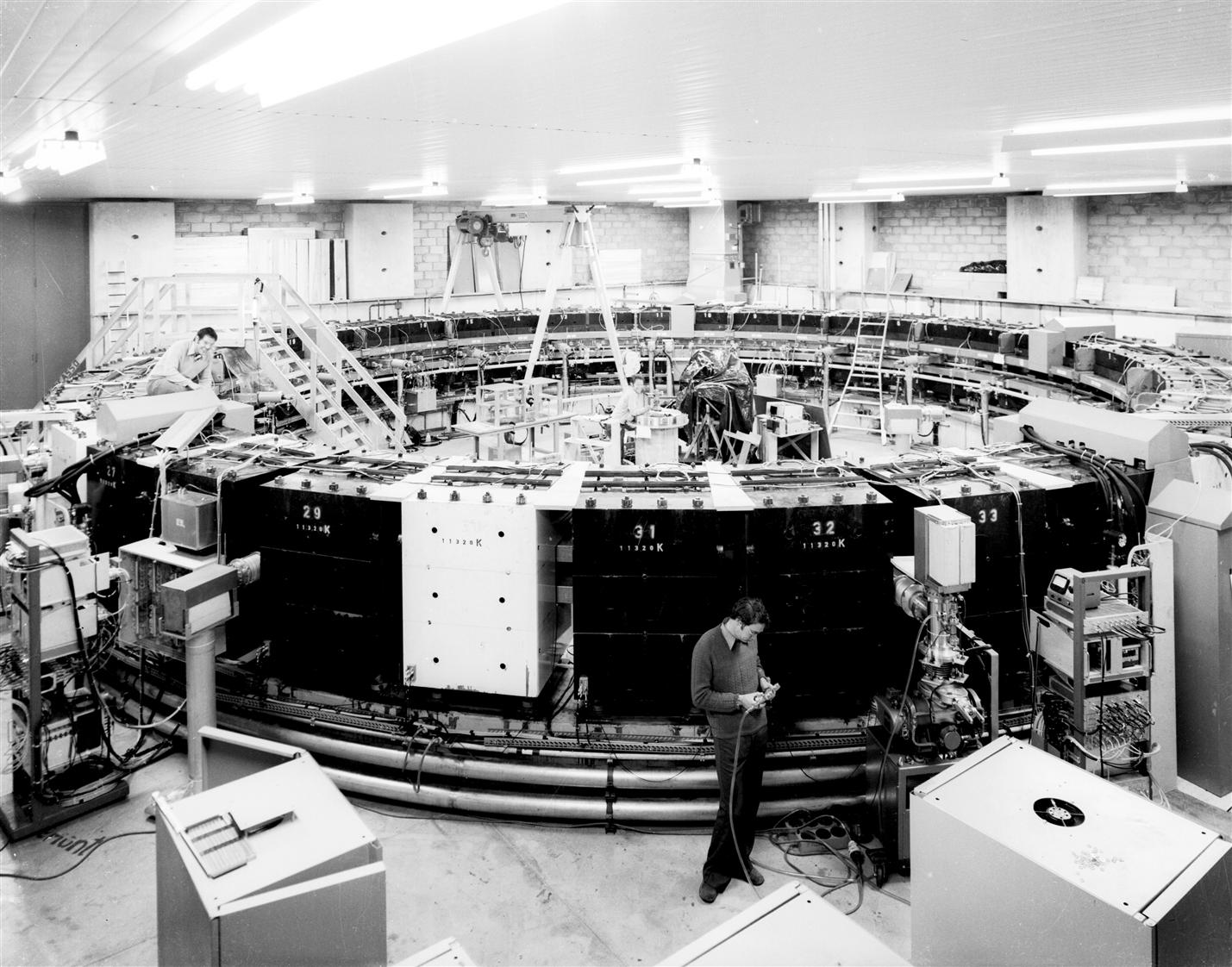
The storage ring of the Muon g − 2 experiment at CERN

The first muon g − 2 experiments began at CERN in 1959 at the initiative of Leon M. Lederman. A group of six physicists formed the first experiment, using the Synchrocyclotron at CERN. The first results were published in 1961, with a 2% precision with respect to the theoretical value, and then the second ones with this time a 0.4% precision, hence validating the quantum electrodynamics theory.

A second experiment started in 1966 with a new group, working this time with the Proton Synchrotron, also at CERN. The results were then 25 times more precise than the previous ones and showed a quantitative discrepancy between the experimental values and the theoretical ones, and thus required the physicists to recalculate their theoretical model.

The third experiment, which started in 1969, published its final results in 1979, confirming the theory with a precision of 0.0007%.

The United States took over the g − 2 experiment in 1984.

=== Muon g − 2 at Brookhaven National Laboratory ===
The next stage of Muon g − 2 research was conducted at the Brookhaven National Laboratory (BNL) Alternating Gradient Synchrotron; the experiment was known as (BNL) Muon E821 experiment, but it has also been called "muon experiment at BNL" or "(muon) g − 2 at BNL" etc. Brookhaven's Muon g − 2 experiment was constructed from 1989 to 1996 and collected data from 1997 to 2001.

The experiment was done similarly to the last of the CERN experiments with the goal of having 20 times better precision. The technique involved storing 3.094 GeV muons in a uniform measured magnetic field and observing the difference of the muon spin precession and rotation frequency via detection of the muon decay electrons. The advance in precision relied crucially on a much more intense beam than was available at CERN and the injection of muons into the storage ring, whereas the previous CERN experiments had injected pions into the storage ring, of which only a small fraction decay into muons that are stored. The experiment used a much more uniform magnetic field using a superferric superconducting storage ring magnet, a passive superconducting inflector magnet, fast muon kickers to deflect the injected muons onto stored orbits, a beam tube NMR trolley that could map the magnetic field in the storage region, and numerous other experimental advances. The experiment took data with positive and negative muons between 1997 and 2001. Its final result is a_{μ} = (g − 2)/2 = 11659208.0(5.4)(3.3)×10^{−10} obtained by combination of consistent results with similar precision from positive and negative muons.

=== Muon g − 2 at Fermilab ===
Fermilab is continuing the experiment conducted at Brookhaven to measure the anomalous magnetic dipole moment of the muon. The Brookhaven experiment ended in 2001, but ten years later Fermilab, which is able to produce a purer beam of muons than Brookhaven, acquired the equipment. The goal is to make a more accurate measurement (smaller σ) that will either eliminate the discrepancy between Brookhaven's results and theory predictions or confirm it as an experimentally observable example of physics beyond the Standard Model.

The magnet was refurbished and powered on in September 2015, and has been confirmed to have the same 1.3 ppm basic magnetic field uniformity that it had before the move.

As of October 2016 the magnet has been rebuilt and carefully shimmed to produce a highly uniform magnetic field. New efforts at Fermilab have resulted in a three-fold improved overall uniformity, which is important for the new measurement at its higher precision goal.

In April 2017 the collaboration was preparing the experiment for the first production run with protons – to calibrate detector systems. The magnet received its first beam of muons in its new location on May 31, 2017. Data taking was planned to run until 2020.

On April 7, 2021, the result from run 1 experiment were published: a_{μ} = 0.00116592040(54). The new experimental world-average results announced by the Muon g − 2 collaboration are: g-factor: 2.00233184122(82), anomalous magnetic moment: 0.00116592061(41). The combined results from Fermilab and Brookhaven show a difference with theory at a significance of 4.2 sigma (or standard deviations), slightly under the 5 sigma that particle physicists require to claim a discovery, but still evidence of new physics. The chance that a statistical fluctuation would produce equally striking results is about 1 in 40,000.

Data-taking came to an end on July 9, 2023, when the collaboration shut off the muon beam, concluding the experiment after six years of data collection. On August 10, 2023, the results from run 1, 2 and 3 (that is, the first three years of data-taking) were announced, giving a new world average of a_{μ} = 0.00116592059(22), representing an improvement of a factor of two in the error from the 2021 results. Although this experimental result is 5.1 sigma deviation from the 2020 Standard Model theory prediction, it differs only by roughly 1 sigma from the prediction yielded by recent lattice calculations. This discrepancy between the experiment and theory is under further study.

On June 3, 2025, the Fermilab experiment reached its final, most precise measurement of the muon magnetic moment incorporating all six runs of data in the analysis. The latest experimental value of the magnetic moment of the muon was reported to be a_{μ} = 0.001165920705(114), producing a further improvement of a factor of two in the error from 2023 results. The reported precision of the result at 0.127 ppm also surpassed the experimental design goal of 0.14 ppm. On April 22, 2026, new set of calculations of the magnetic moment were published in Nature claiming just 0.5 standard deviation and verification of the value up to 11 digits with the standard model.

== Theory of magnetic moments ==
The g factor of a charged lepton (electron, muon, or tau) is very nearly 2. The difference from 2 (the "anomalous" part) depends on the lepton, and can be computed quite precisely based on the current Standard Model of particle physics. Measurements of the electron's g factor are in excellent agreement with this computation. The Brookhaven experiment did this measurement for muons, a much more technically difficult measurement due to their short lifetime, and detected a tantalizing, but not definitive, discrepancy between the measured value and the prediction of the Standard Model.

The computation of the Standard Model prediction of the muon's g factor is extremely complicated, and several different approaches exist. The main difficulty is that the value is affected by virtual hadrons.

In 2020, the Muon g − 2 Theory Initiative published their computed consensus value of the muon's g factor, based on perturbative methods. In 2021, the Budapest–Marseille–Wuppertal (BMW) collaboration published results of lattice QCD computations of the g factor that stood between the experimental value obtained at Fermilab and the theoretical value calculated by the Muon g − 2 Theory Initiative. Subsequent works by the Coordinated Lattice Simulations (CLS) group and the European Twisted Mass Collaboration (ETMC) have come closer each to the theoretical value, suggesting there could be systematical errors in the estimation of the R-ratio of the hadronic vacuum polarization.

== Design ==
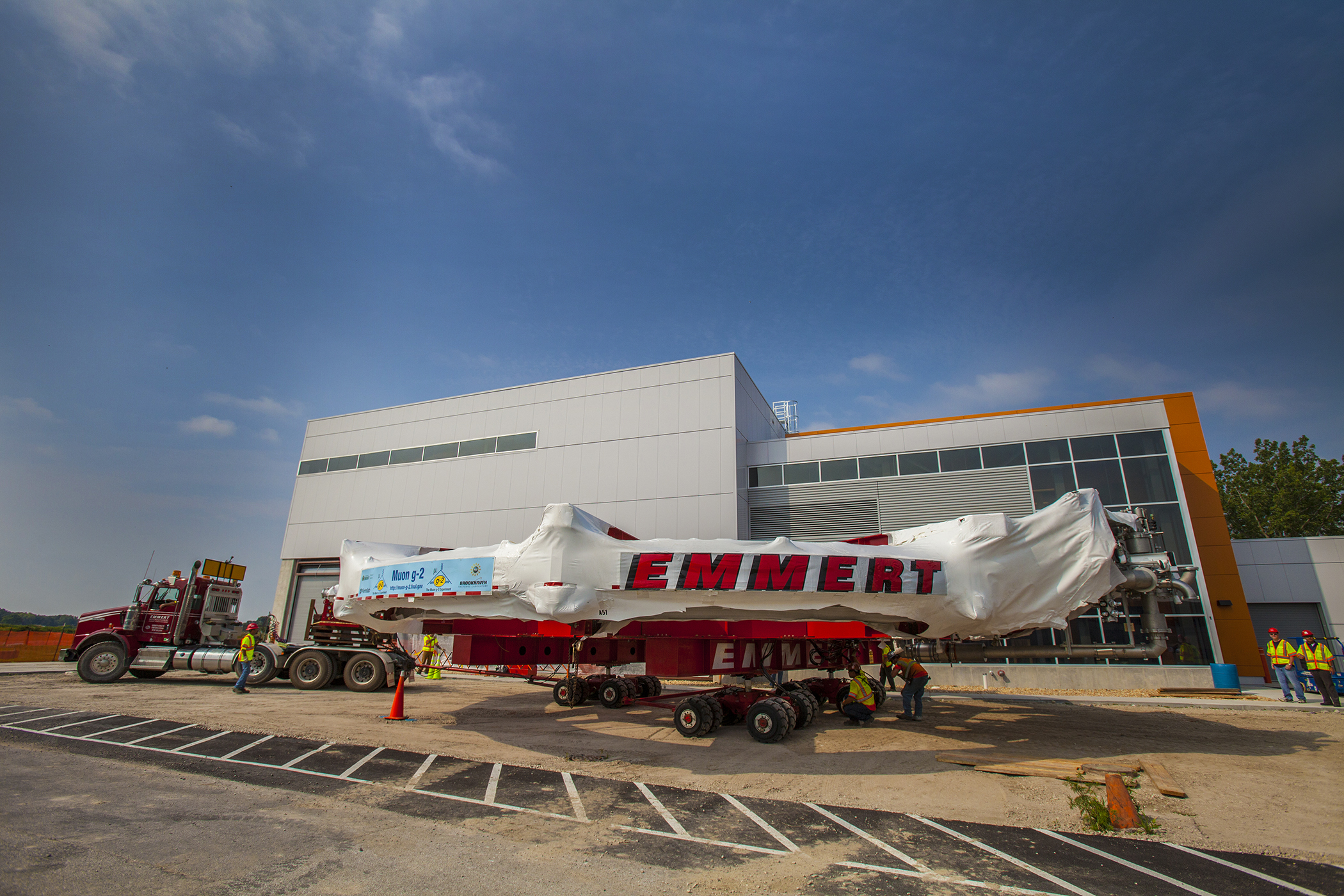
The g − 2 ring arriving at its final destination – the experimental hall (MC1) at Fermilab – on July 30, 2014

=== Magnet ===
Central to the experiment is a 50-foot (15 m)-diameter superconducting magnet with an exceptionally uniform magnetic field, used as a storage ring. This was transported, in one piece, from Brookhaven in Long Island, New York, to Fermilab in the summer of 2013. The move traversed 3,200 miles (5,100 km) over 35 days, mostly on a barge down the East Coast and through Mobile, Alabama, to the Tennessee–Tombigbee Waterway and then briefly on the Mississippi. The initial and final legs were on a special truck traveling closed highways at night.

The Muon g − 2 experiment injected 3.1 GeV polarized muons produced at the Fermilab Muon Campus into the storage ring that was significantly upgraded from the Brookhaven experiment.

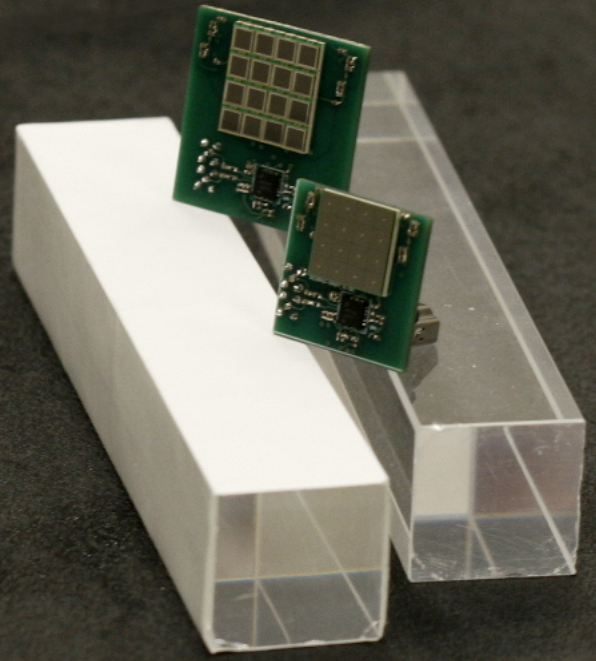
Sample 25 mm × 25 mm × 140 mm PbF_{2} crystals (bare and wrapped in Millipore paper) are pictured together with a 16 channel monolithic Hamamatsu SiPM.

=== Detectors ===
The magnetic moment measurement is realized by 24 electromagnetic calorimetric detectors, which are distributed uniformly on the inside of the storage ring. The calorimeters measure the energy and time of arrival (relative to the injection time) of the decay positrons (and their count) from the muon decay in the storage ring. After a muon decays into a positron and two neutrinos, the positron ends up with less energy than the original muon. Thus, the magnetic field curls it inward where it hits a segmented lead(II) fluoride (PbF_{2}) calorimeter read out by silicon photo-multipliers (SiPM).

The tracking detectors register the trajectory of the positrons from the muon decay in the storage ring. The tracker can provide a muon electric dipole moment measurement, but not directly the magnetic moment measurement. The main purpose of the tracker is to measure the muon beam profile, as well as resolution of pile-up of events (for reduction of the systematic uncertainty in the calorimeter measurement).

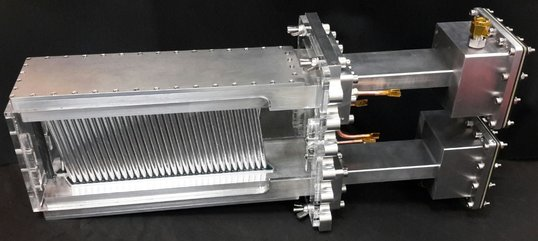
One of the 4 rows of 32 straws is shown. A straw (length of 100 mm, and diameter of 5 mm) acts like an ionisation chamber filled with 1:1 argon:ethane, with a central cathode wire at +1.6 kV.

=== Magnetic field ===
To measure the magnetic moment to ppb level of precision requires a uniform average magnetic field to be of the same level precision. The experimental goal of g − 2 is to achieve an uncertainty level on the magnetic field to 70 ppb averaged over time and muon distribution. A uniform field of 1.45 T is created in the storage ring using superconducting magnets, and the field value will be actively mapped throughout the ring using an NMR probe on a mobile trolley (without breaking the vacuum). Calibration of the trolley is referenced to the Larmor frequency of a proton in a spherical water sample at a reference temperature (34.7 °C), and is cross-calibrated to a novel helium-3 magnetometer.

=== Data acquisition ===
An essential component of the experiment is the data acquisition (DAQ) system, which manages the data flow from the detector electronics. The requirement for the experiment is to acquire raw data at a rate of 18 GB/s. This is accomplished by employing parallel data-processing architecture using 24 high-speed GPUs (NVIDIA Tesla K40) to process data from 12-bit waveform digitisers. The set-up is controlled by the MIDAS DAQ software framework. The DAQ system processes data from 1296 calorimeter channels, three straw tracker stations, and auxiliary detectors (e.g. entrance muon counters). The total data output of the experiment is estimated at 2 PB.

== Collaboration ==
The following universities, laboratories, and companies are participating in the experiment:

=== Universities ===
- Boston University
- Cornell University
- Johannes Gutenberg University Mainz
- University of Chicago
- University of Illinois at Urbana-Champaign
- James Madison University
- Korea Advanced Institute of Science and Technology (KAIST)
- University of Kentucky
- University of Liverpool
- Lancaster University
- University College London
- University of Manchester
- University of Massachusetts
- Michigan State University
- University of Michigan
- University of Mississippi
- Università del Molise
- Università degli Studi di Napoli Federico II
- North Central College
- Northern Illinois University
- Regis University
- Shanghai Jiao Tong University
- Technische Universitat Dresden
- Università di Udine
- University of Virginia
- University of Washington

=== Laboratories ===
- Argonne National Laboratory
- Brookhaven National Laboratory
- Fermi National Accelerator Laboratory
- Budker Institute of Nuclear Physics
- Istituto Nazionale di Fisica Nucleare
- Joint Institute for Nuclear Research, Dubna
- Laboratori Nazionali di Frascati
- INFN, Sezione di Napoli
- INFN, Sezione di Pisa
- INFN, Sezione di Roma Tor Vergata
- Institute for Basic Science, S. Korea
