= Bohr magneton =

Unit of magnetic moment

The value of the Bohr magneton
System of units	Value
SI	9.2740100657(29)×10^{−24} J⋅T^{−1}
Gaussian	9.2740100783(28)×10^{−21} erg·G^{−1}
eV/T	5.7883817982(18)×10^{−5} eV⋅T^{−1}
atomic units	1/2 eℏ/m_{e}

In atomic physics, the Bohr magneton (symbol μ_{B}) is a physical constant and the natural unit for expressing the magnetic moment of an electron caused by its orbital or spin angular momentum. In SI units, the Bohr magneton is defined as

𝜇_{B} = eℏ/2m_{e}

and in the Gaussian CGS units as

𝜇_{B} = eℏ/2m_{e}c

where

- e is the elementary charge,
- ℏ is the reduced Planck constant,
- m_{e} is the electron mass,
- c is the speed of light.

== History ==
The idea of elementary magnets is due to Walther Ritz (1907) and Pierre Weiss. Already before the Rutherford model of atomic structure, several theorists commented that the magneton should involve the Planck constant h. By postulating that the ratio of electron kinetic energy to orbital frequency should be equal to h, Richard Gans computed a value that was twice as large as the Bohr magneton in September 1911. At the First Solvay Conference in November that year, Paul Langevin obtained a value of eℏ/(2m_{e}). Langevin assumed that the attractive force was inversely proportional to distance to the power n + 1, and specifically n = 1.

The Romanian physicist Ștefan Procopiu had obtained the expression for the magnetic moment of the electron in 1913. The value is sometimes referred to as the "Bohr–Procopiu magneton" in Romanian scientific literature. The Weiss magneton was experimentally derived in 1911 as a unit of magnetic moment equal to 1.53×10^{−24} J⋅T^{-1} which is about 20% of the Bohr magneton.

In the summer of 1913, the values for the natural units of atomic angular momentum and magnetic moment were obtained by the Danish physicist Niels Bohr as a consequence of his atom model. In 1920, Wolfgang Pauli gave the Bohr magneton its name in an article where he contrasted it with the magneton of the experimentalists which he called the Weiss magneton.

== Theory ==
A magnetic moment of an electron in an atom is composed of two components. First, the orbital motion of an electron around a nucleus generates a magnetic moment by Ampère's circuital law. Second, the inherent rotation, or spin, of the electron has a spin magnetic moment.

In the Bohr model of the atom, for an electron that is in the orbit of lowest energy, its orbital angular momentum has magnitude equal to the reduced Planck constant, denoted ℏ. The Bohr magneton is the magnitude of the magnetic dipole moment of an electron orbiting an atom with this angular momentum.

The spin angular momentum of an electron is 1/2ℏ, but the intrinsic electron magnetic moment caused by its spin is also approximately one Bohr magneton, which results in the electron spin g-factor, a factor relating spin angular momentum to corresponding magnetic moment of a particle, having a value of approximately 2.

== See also ==
- Anomalous magnetic moment
- Electron magnetic moment
- Bohr radius
- Nuclear magneton
- Parson magneton
- Physical constant
- Zeeman effect
