= Anomalous magnetic dipole moment =

Value in quantum electrodynamics

In quantum electrodynamics, the anomalous magnetic moment of a particle is a contribution of effects of quantum mechanics, expressed by Feynman diagrams with loops, to the magnetic moment of that particle. The magnetic moment, also called magnetic dipole moment, is a measure of the strength of a magnetic source.

The "Dirac" magnetic moment, corresponding to tree-level Feynman diagrams (which can be thought of as the classical result), can be calculated from the Dirac equation. It is usually expressed in terms of the g-factor; the Dirac equation predicts $g = 2$. For particles such as the electron, this classical result differs from the observed value by a small fraction of a percent. The difference is the anomalous magnetic moment, denoted $a$ and defined as
$$a = \frac{g-2}{2}$$

== Electron ==
One-loop correction to a fermion's magnetic dipole moment.

The one-loop contribution to the anomalous magnetic moment—corresponding to the first and largest quantum mechanical correction—of the electron is found by calculating the vertex function shown in the adjacent diagram. The calculation is relatively straightforward and the one-loop result is:
$$a_\text{e} = \frac{\alpha}{2 \pi} \approx 0.001\,161\,4 ,$$
where $\alpha$ is the fine-structure constant. This result was first found by Julian Schwinger in 1948 and is engraved on his tombstone. As of 2016, the coefficients of the QED formula for the anomalous magnetic moment of the electron are known analytically up to $\alpha^3$ and have been calculated up to order $\alpha^5$:
$$a_\text{e} = 0.001\,159\,652\,181\,643(764)$$

The QED prediction agrees with the experimentally measured value to more than 10 significant figures, making the magnetic moment of the electron one of the most accurately verified predictions in the history of physics. (See Precision tests of QED for details.)

The current experimental value and uncertainty is:
$$a_\text{e} = 0.001\,159\,652\,180\,59(13)$$
According to this value, $a_\text{e}$ is known to an accuracy of around 1 part in 10 billion (10^{10}). This required measuring $g$ to an accuracy of around 1 part in 10 trillion (10^{13}).

== Muon ==
Proposed Minimal Supersymmetric Standard Model one-loop corrections to the muon g−2 involving particles beyond the standard model: a neutralino and a smuon, and a chargino and a muon sneutrino respectively.

The anomalous magnetic moment of the muon is calculated in a similar way to the electron. The prediction for the value of the muon anomalous magnetic moment includes three parts:
$$a_\mu^\mathrm{SM} = a_\mu^\mathrm{QED} + a_\mu^\mathrm{EW} + a_\mu^\mathrm{hadron}.$$

Of the first two components, $a_\mu^\mathrm{QED}$ represents the photon and lepton loops, and $a_\mu^\mathrm{EW}$ the W boson, Higgs boson and Z boson loops; both can be calculated precisely from first principles. The third term, $a_\mu^\mathrm{hadron}$, represents hadron loops; it cannot be calculated accurately from theory alone. It is either estimated from experimental measurements of the ratio of hadronic to muonic cross sections (R) in electron–antielectron (e^{−}–e^{+}) collisions, or else calculated from scratch in lattice gauge theory.

The E821 Experiment at Brookhaven National Laboratory (BNL) studied the precession of muon and antimuon in a constant external magnetic field as they circulated in a confining storage ring. The E821 Experiment reported the following average value $a_\mu = 0.001\; 165\; 920\; 9 (6).$

In 2024, the Fermilab collaboration "Muon g−2" doubled the accuracy of this value over the group's previous measurements from the 2018 data set. The data for the experiment were collected during the 2019–2020 runs. The independent value came in at $a_\mu = 0.001\,165\,920\,57(25)$, which, combined with measurements from Brookhaven National Laboratory, yields a world average of $a_\mu = 0.001\,165\,920\,59(22)$. In June 2025, the "Muon g−2" team published their final results for the magnetic moment as an eprint, at $a_\mu = 0.001\,165\,920\,705(148)$, bringing the world average to
$$a_\mu = 0.001\,165\,920\,715(145).$$

For a long time, experimental measurements and theoretical predictions of this quantity disagreed, making the muon's anomalous magnetic moment a long-standing discrepancy between the Standard Model and experiment. As of July 2017, for instance, the measurement disagreed with the Standard Model by 3.5 standard deviations. This disagreement was seen as suggesting physics beyond the Standard Model may be having an effect, or else that the theoretical/experimental errors were not completely under control.

In April 2021, an international group of fourteen physicists reported that by using ab-initio quantum chromodynamics and quantum electrodynamics simulations they were able to obtain a theory-based approximation agreeing more with the experimental value than with the previous theory-based value that relied on the electron–positron annihilation experiments. In May 2025, a large international consortium of scientists reported calculations in which the estimate of the quark and gluon contributions that in earlier calculations had been based on experimental data had been replaced with from-scratch lattice QCD calculations. This yielded
$$a_\mu = 0.001\,165\,920\,33(62),$$
which was compatible both with the then-best experimental data and with the final "Muon g−2" result that was published a few weeks after.

== Tau ==
The Standard Model prediction for the tau's anomalous magnetic dipole moment is
$$a_\tau=0.001\,177\,21(5) ,$$
while the best measured bound for $a_\tau$ is
$$a_\tau = {0.0009}_{-0.0031}^{+0.0032},$$
reported by the CMS experiment at the CERN LHC.

== Composite particles ==
Composite particles often have large anomalous magnetic moments. The nucleons, protons and neutrons, both composed of quarks, are examples. The nucleon magnetic moments are both larger than expected for elementary particles; the neutron's magnetic moment would be expected to be zero due to its charge being zero.

== See also ==
- Anomalous electric dipole moment
- Electron magnetic moment
- g-factor (physics)
- Gordon decomposition

== Bibliography ==
- Sergei Vonsovsky (1975). Magnetism of Elementary Particles. Mir Publishers.
