= R (cross section ratio) =

R is the ratio of the hadronic cross section to the muon cross section in electron–positron collisions:

$$R = \frac{\sigma^{(0)}(e^+e^-\rightarrow \mathrm{hadrons})}{\sigma(e^+e^-\rightarrow \mu^+\mu^-)},$$

where the superscript (0) indicates that the cross section has been corrected for initial state radiation. R is an important input in the calculation of the anomalous magnetic dipole moment. Experimental values have been measured for center-of-mass energies from 400 MeV to 150 GeV.

R also provides experimental confirmation of the electric charge of quarks, in particular the charm quark and bottom quark, and the existence of three quark colors. A simplified calculation of R yields

$$R = 3\sum_q e_q^2/e^2,$$

where the sum is over all quark flavors with mass less than the beam energy. e_{q} is the electric charge of the quark, and the factor of 3 accounts for the three colors of the quarks. QCD corrections to this formula have been calculated.

Usually, the denominator in R is not the actual experimental μμ cross section, but the off-resonance theoretical QED cross-section: this makes resonances more visibly dramatic than normalization by the μμ cross section, which is also greatly enhanced at these resonances (hadronic states, and Z boson).
