= Sergei Vonsovsky =

Soviet physicist (1910–1998)

Sergei Vasilyevich Vonsovsky (also spelled as Vonsovskii or Vonsovskiy, Russian: Сергей Васильевич Вонсовский; September 2, 1910 – August 11, 1998) was a Soviet physicist. He was named a Hero of Socialist Labour in 1969.

== Biography ==
Sergei Vonsovsky was born in 1910 in Tashkent. In 1932 he graduated from the Leningrad University. In 1932 he moved to Sverdlovsk and started working at the Ural Physicotechical Institute, later – at the Metals Physics Institute of the Ural branch of the Russian Academy of Sciences. In 1943 he defended his second thesis and received the highest scientific degree of Doctor of Sciences. From 1947 he also kept a professorship at the chair of theoretical physics at the department of physics of the Ural State University. Since 1971 to 1985 he was the director of the Ural branch of the Academy of Sciences of the Soviet Union.

Sergei Vonsovsky led researches in the field of metal physics studying the transition metals and the fusions. He created the fusions ferromagnetism theory and developed the theory of magnetic anisotropy. He also worked at the field of the transition metals and fusions superconductivity in particular he studied the problem of simultaneity of ferromagnetism and paramagnetism.

He was the founder of the Ural scientific school in ferromagnetism and metals physics.

Ural Branch of the Russian Academy of Sciences instituted Vonsovsky Gold Medal in his honour.

== Honours ==
- Full Member of the Academy of Sciences of the Soviet Union (1966)
- Hero of Socialist Labour (1969)
- Foreign member of the Polish Academy of Sciences
- Foreign corresponding member of the German Academy of Sciences
- USSR State Prize (1975, 1982)
- Vavilov Gold Medal of the Russian Academy of Sciences (1982)
- Three Orders of Lenin
- Order of the Red Star
- Order of the Red Banner of Labour
- Demidov Prize (1993)
- Honorary Citizen of Sverdlovsk (1984)

One of the streets of Yekaterinburg is called after academician Vonsovsky. The main scientific award of the Ural branch of the Russian Academy of Sciences is called the Vonsovsky Gold Medal. In Yekaterinburg you may also find a monument to Sergei Vonsovsky.

== Short bibliography ==
- S. V. Vonsovsky & Y. S. Shur, Ferromagnetism (Moscow, 1948)
- S. V. Vonsovskii, Ferromagnetic Resonance (Pergamon: Oxford, 1966)
- S. V. Vonsovsky, Magnetism (Wiley, 1974), in two volumes
- S. V. Vonsovsky, Magnetism of elementary particles (Moscow, 1975)
- S. V. Vonsovsky and M. I. Katsnelson, Quantum Solid State Physics (1989)
