= Nuclear magneton =

Physical constant

The value of nuclear magneton
System of units	Value
SI	5.0507837393(16)×10^{−27} J⋅T^{−1}
Gaussian	5.05078374×10^{−24} erg·G^{−1}
eV	3.15245125417(98)×10^{−8} eV·T^{−1}
MHz/T (per h)	7.6225932188(24) MHz/T

The nuclear magneton (symbol μ_{N}) is a physical constant of magnetic moment, defined in SI units by:
$$\mu_\text{N} = {{e \hbar} \over {2 m_\text{p}}}$$
and in Gaussian CGS units by:
$$\mu_\text{N} = {{e \hbar} \over{2 m_\text{p} c}}$$
where:

- e is the elementary charge,
- ħ is the reduced Planck constant,
- m_{p} is the proton rest mass, and
- c is the speed of light

Its CODATA recommended value is:

μ_{N} = 5.0507837393(16)×10^{−27} J⋅T^{−1}

In Gaussian CGS units, its value can be given in convenient units as

μ_{N} = 0.10515446 e⋅fm

The nuclear magneton is the natural unit for expressing magnetic dipole moments of heavy particles such as nucleons and atomic nuclei.

Due to neutrons and protons having internal structure and not being Dirac particles, their magnetic moments differ from μ_{N}:

μ_{p} = 2.793 μ_{N}
μ_{n} = −1.913 μ_{N}

The magnetic dipole moment of the electron, which is much larger as a consequence of much larger charge-to-mass ratio, is usually expressed in units of the Bohr magneton, which is calculated in the same fashion using the electron mass. The result is larger than μ_{N} by a factor equal to the proton-to-electron mass ratio, about 1836.

== See also ==
- Nucleon magnetic moment
