= Solid-state chemistry =

Study of solid materials' properties and composition

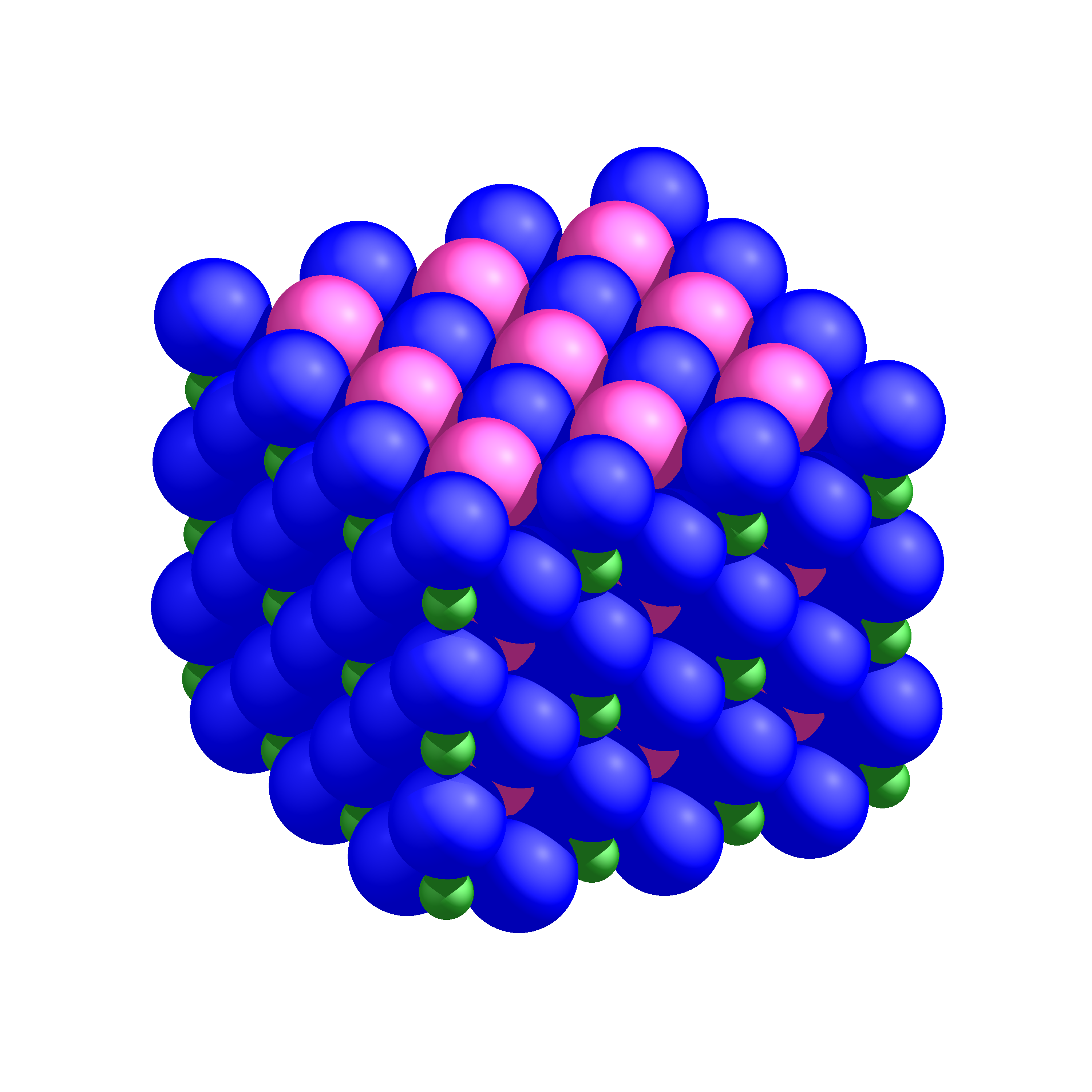
A perovskite-type oxide crystalline structure, (Sr_{1-2x}Na_{x}La_{x})TiO_{3}, showing a cubic arrangement of oxide anions (O^{2-}, blue) and large cations (Sr^{2+}, violet), with titanium (Ti^{4+}, green) occupying octahedral voids.

Solid-state chemistry, also referred to as materials chemistry, is the study of the synthesis, structure, and properties of solid phase materials. It therefore has a strong overlap with solid-state physics, mineralogy, crystallography, ceramics, metallurgy, thermodynamics, materials science and electronics with a focus on the synthesis of novel materials and their characterization. A diverse range of synthetic techniques, such as the ceramic method and chemical vapour deposition, make solid-state materials. Solids can be classified as crystalline or amorphous on basis of the nature of order present in the arrangement of their constituent particles. Their elemental compositions, microstructures, and physical properties can be characterized through a variety of analytical methods.

== History ==
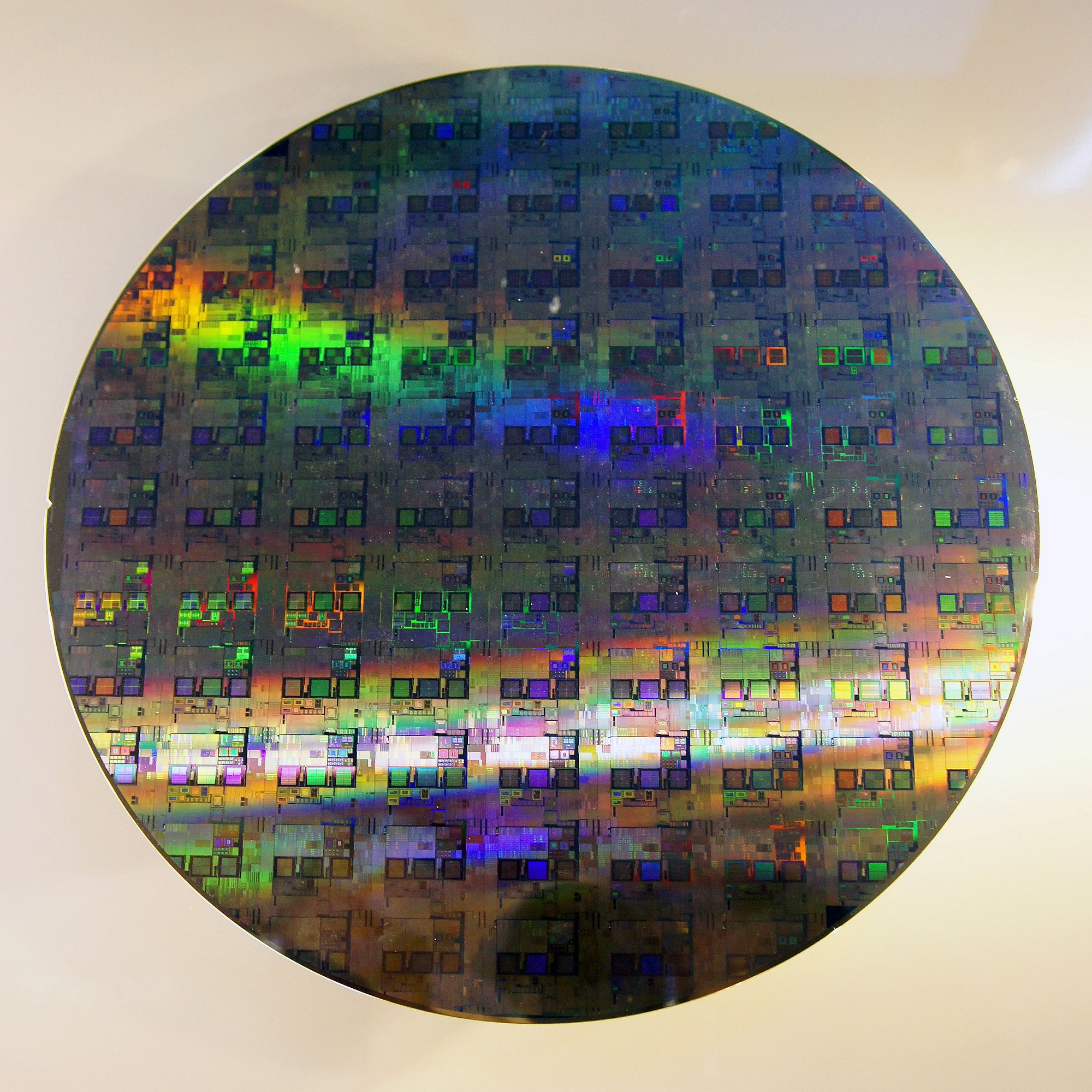
Silicon wafer for use in electronic devices

Because of its direct relevance to products of commerce, solid state inorganic chemistry has been strongly driven by technology. Progress in the field has often been fueled by the demands of industry, sometimes in collaboration with academia. Applications discovered in the 20th century include zeolite and platinum-based catalysts for petroleum processing in the 1950s, high-purity silicon as a core component of microelectronic devices in the 1960s, and "high temperature" superconductivity in the 1980s. The invention of X-ray crystallography in the early 1900s by William Lawrence Bragg was an enabling innovation. Our understanding of how reactions proceed at the atomic level in the solid state was advanced considerably by Carl Wagner's work on oxidation rate theory, counter diffusion of ions, and defect chemistry. Because of his contributions, he has sometimes been referred to as the father of solid state chemistry.

== Synthetic methods ==
Given the diversity of solid-state compounds, an equally diverse array of methods are used for their preparation. Synthesis can range from high-temperature methods, like the ceramic method, to gas methods, like chemical vapour deposition. Often, the methods prevent defect formation or produce high-purity products.

=== High-temperature methods ===
==== Ceramic method ====
The ceramic method is one of the most common synthesis techniques. The synthesis occurs entirely in the solid state. The reactants are ground together, formed into a pellet using a pellet press and hydraulic press, and heated at high temperatures. When the temperature of the reactants are sufficient, the ions at the grain boundaries react to form desired phases. Generally ceramic methods give polycrystalline powders, but not single crystals.

Using a mortar and pestle, ResonantAcoustic mixer, or ball mill, the reactants are ground together, which decreases size and increases surface area of the reactants. If the mixing is not sufficient, we can use techniques such as co-precipitation and sol-gel. A chemist forms pellets from the ground reactants and places the pellets into containers for heating. The choice of container depends on the precursors, the reaction temperature and the expected product. For example, metal oxides are typically synthesized in silica or alumina containers. A tube furnace heats the pellet. Tube furnaces are available up to maximum temperatures of 2800 °C.

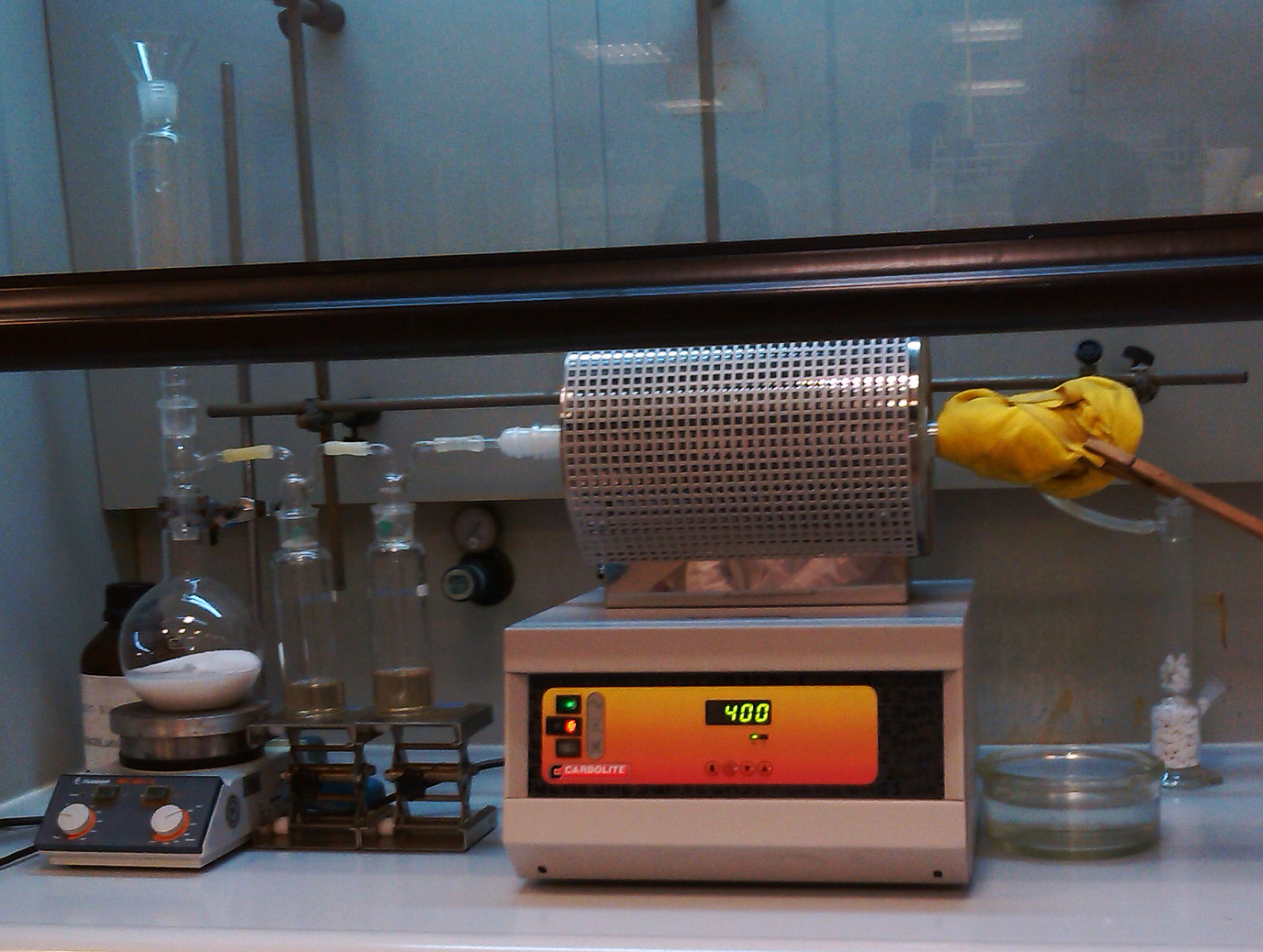
Tube furnace being used during the synthesis of aluminium chloride

==== Molten flux synthesis ====
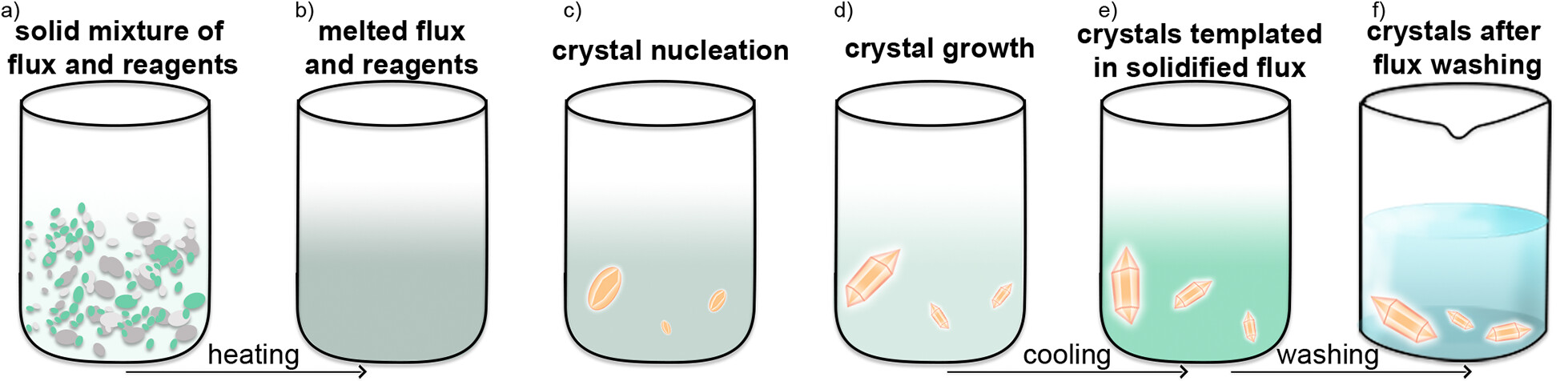
Steps involved in molten flux synthesis

Molten flux synthesis can be an efficient method for obtaining single crystals. In this method, the starting reagents are combined with flux, an inert material with a melting point lower than that of the starting materials. The flux serves as a solvent. After the reaction, the excess flux can be washed away using an appropriate solvent or it can be heat again to remove the flux by sublimation if it is a volatile compound.

Crucible materials have a great role to play in molten flux synthesis. The crucible should not react with the flux or the starting reagent. If any of the material is volatile, it is recommended to conduct the reaction in a sealed ampule. If the target phase is sensitive to oxygen, a carbon- coated fused silica tube or a carbon crucible inside a fused silica tube is often used which prevents the direct contact between the tube wall and reagents.

==== Chemical vapour transport ====
Chemical vapour transport results in very pure materials. The reaction typically occurs in a sealed ampoule. A transporting agent, added to the sealed ampoule, produces a volatile intermediate species from the solid reactant. For metal oxides, the transporting agent is usually Cl_{2} or HCl. The ampoule has a temperature gradient, and, as the gaseous reactant travels along the gradient, it eventually deposits as a crystal. An example of an industrially-used chemical vapor transport reaction is the Mond process. The Mond process involves heating impure nickel in a stream of carbon monoxide to produce pure nickel.

=== Low-temperature methods ===
==== Intercalation method ====
Intercalation synthesis is the insertion of molecules or ions between layers of a solid. The layered solid has weak intermolecular bonds holding its layers together. The process occurs via diffusion. Intercalation is further driven by ion exchange, acid-base reactions or electrochemical reactions. The intercalation method was first used in China with the discovery of porcelain. Also, graphene is produced by the intercalation method, and this method is the principle behind lithium-ion batteries.

=== Solution methods ===
It is possible to use solvents to prepare solids by precipitation or by evaporation. At times, the solvent is a hydrothermal that is under pressure at temperatures higher than the normal boiling point. A variation on this theme is the use of flux methods, which use a salt with a relatively low melting point as the solvent.

=== Gas methods ===
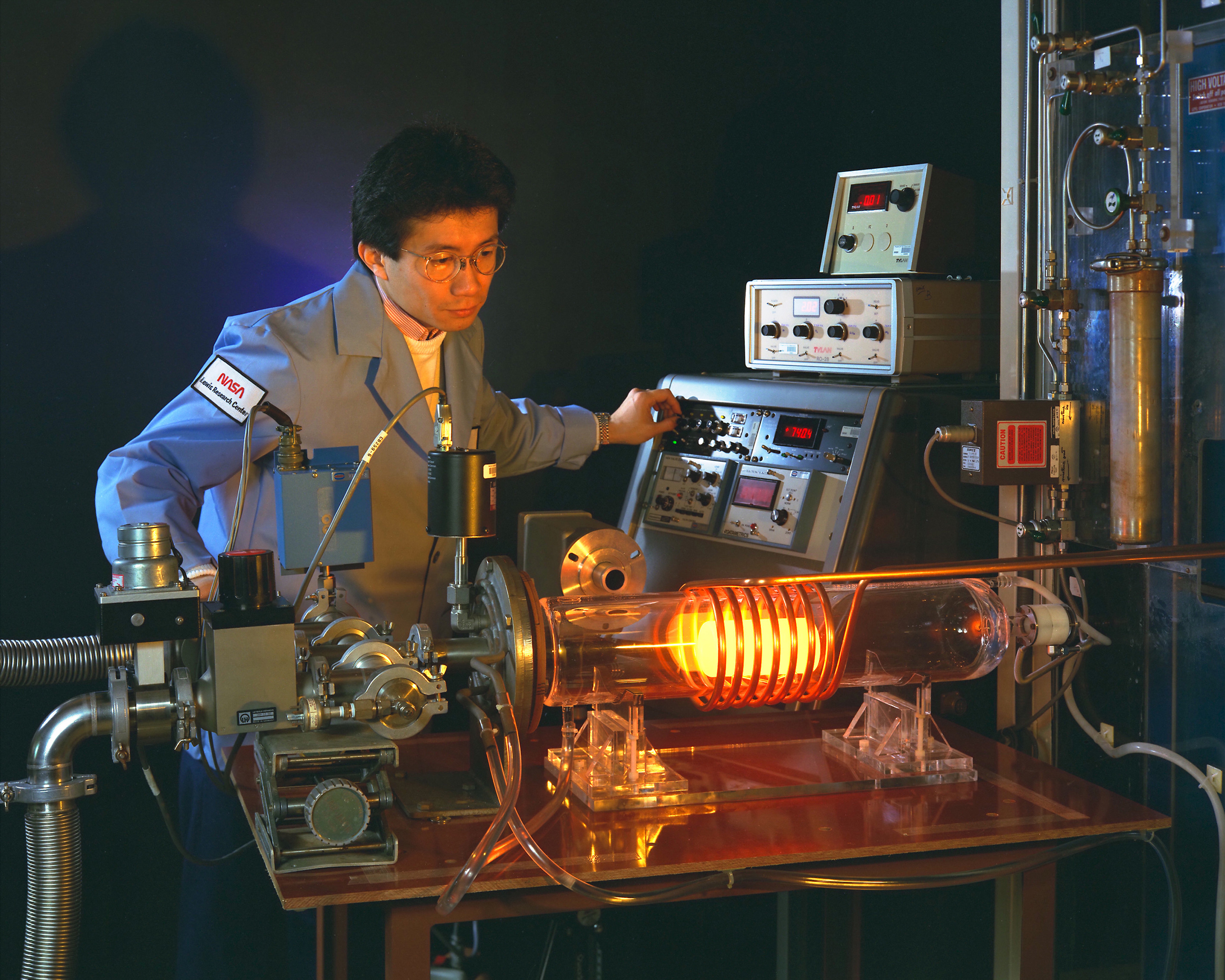
Chemical vapour deposition reaction chamber

Many solids react vigorously with gas species like chlorine, iodine, and oxygen. Other solids form adducts, such as CO or ethylene. Such reactions are conducted in open-ended tubes, which the gasses are passed through. Also, these reactions can take place inside a measuring device such as a TGA. In that case, stoichiometric information can be obtained during the reaction, which helps identify the products.

==== Chemical vapour deposition ====
Chemical vapour deposition is a method widely used for the preparation of coatings and semiconductors from molecular precursors. A carrier gas transports the gaseous precursors to the material for coating.

== Characterization ==
This is the process in which a material's chemical composition, structure, and physical properties are determined using a variety of analytical techniques.

=== New phases ===
Synthetic methodology and characterization often go hand in hand in the sense that not one but a series of reaction mixtures are prepared and subjected to heat treatment. Stoichiometry, a numerical relationship between the quantities of reactant and product, is typically varied systematically. It is important to find which stoichiometries will lead to new solid compounds or solid solutions between known ones. A prime method to characterize the reaction products is powder diffraction because many solid-state reactions will produce polycrystalline molds or powders. Powder diffraction aids in the identification of known phases in the mixture. If a pattern is found that is not known in the diffraction data libraries, an attempt can be made to index the pattern. The characterization of a material's properties is typically easier for a product with crystalline structures.

=== Compositions and structures ===
A scanning electron microscope (SEM) used to observe the surface topography and composition

Once the unit cell of a new phase is known, the next step is to establish the stoichiometry of the phase. This can be done in several ways. Sometimes the composition of the original mixture will give a clue, under the circumstances that only a product with a single powder pattern is found or a phase of a certain composition is made by analogy to known material, but this is rare.

Often, considerable effort in refining the synthetic procedures is required to obtain a pure sample of the new material. If it is possible to separate the product from the rest of the reaction mixture, elemental analysis methods such as scanning electron microscopy (SEM) and transmission electron microscopy (TEM) can be used. The detection of scattered and transmitted electrons from the surface of the sample provides information about the surface topography and composition of the material. Energy dispersive X-ray spectroscopy (EDX) is a technique that uses electron beam excitation. Exciting the inner shell of an atom with incident electrons emits characteristic X-rays with specific energy to each element. The peak energy can identify the chemical composition of a sample, including the distribution and concentration.

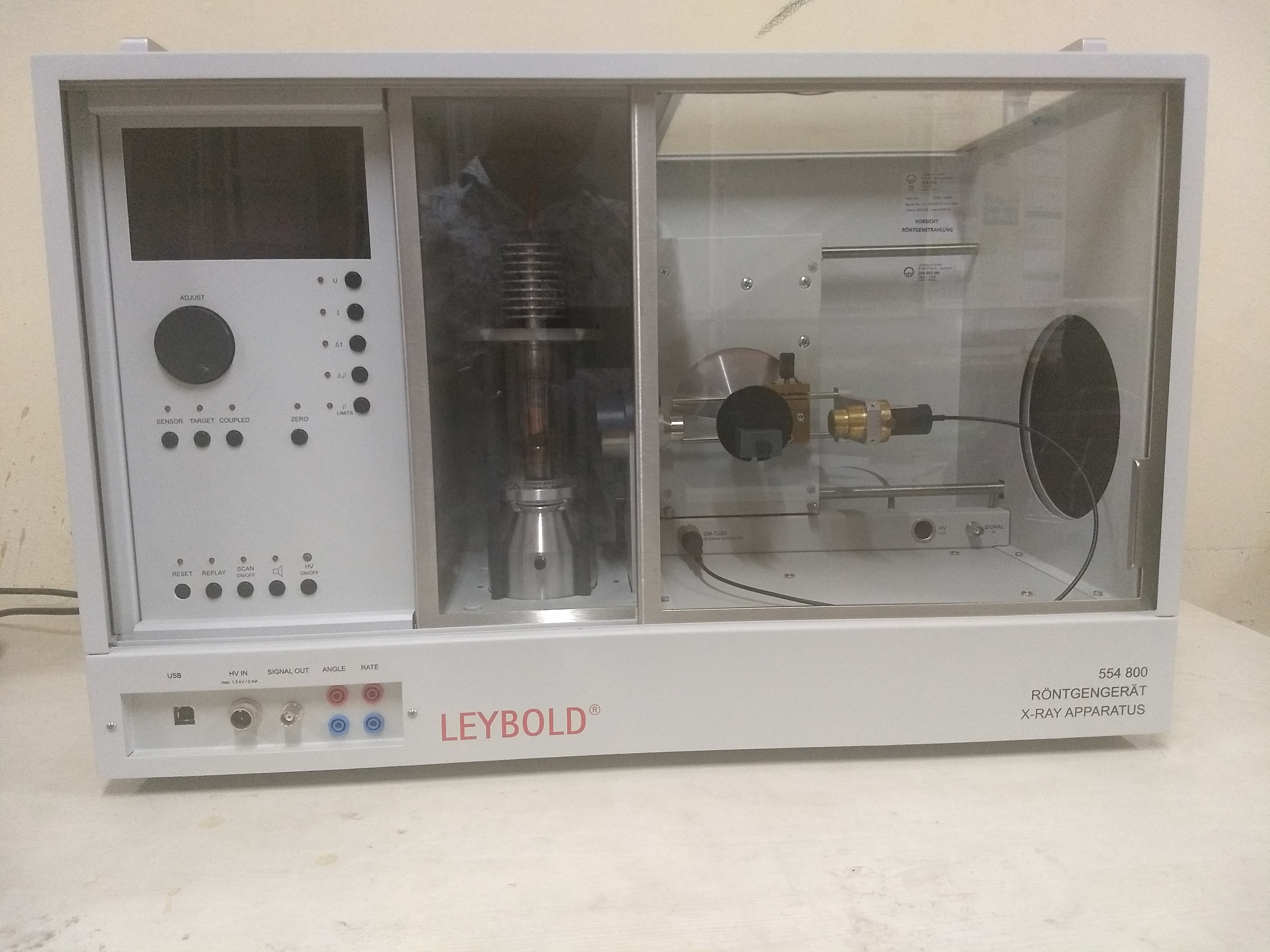
An X-ray diffractometer (XRD) used to identify the crystalline phases in the material

Similar to EDX, X-ray diffraction analysis (XRD) involves the generation of characteristic X-rays upon interaction with the sample. The intensity of diffracted rays scattered at different angles is used to analyze the physical properties of a material such as phase composition and crystallographic structure. These techniques can also be coupled to achieve a better effect. For example, SEM is a useful complement to EDX due to its focused electron beam, it produces a high-magnification image that provides information on the surface topography. Once the area of interest has been identified, EDX can be used to determine the elements present in that specific spot. Selected area electron diffraction can be coupled with TEM or SEM to investigate the level of crystallinity and the lattice parameters of a sample.

==== More information ====
X-ray diffraction is also used due to its imaging capabilities and speed of data generation. The latter often requires revisiting and refining the preparative procedures and that are linked to the question of which phases are stable at what composition and what stoichiometry. In other words, what the phase diagram looks like. An important tool in establishing this are thermal analysis techniques like DSC or DTA and increasingly also, due to the advent of synchrotrons, temperature-dependent powder diffraction. Increased knowledge of the phase relations often leads to further refinement in synthetic procedures in an iterative way. New phases are thus characterized by their melting points and their stoichiometric domains. The latter is important for the many solids that are non-stoichiometric compounds. The cell parameters obtained from XRD are particularly helpful to characterize the homogeneity ranges of the latter.

=== Local structure ===
In contrast to the large structures of crystals, the local structure describes the interaction of the nearest neighbouring atoms. Methods of nuclear spectroscopy use specific nuclei to probe the electric and magnetic fields around the nucleus. E.g. electric field gradients are very sensitive to small changes caused by lattice expansion/compression (thermal or pressure), phase changes, or local defects. Common methods are Mössbauer spectroscopy and perturbed angular correlation.

=== Optical properties ===
For metallic materials, their optical properties arise from the collective excitation of conduction electrons. The coherent oscillations of electrons under electromagnetic radiation along with associated oscillations of the electromagnetic field are called surface plasmon resonances. The excitation wavelength and frequency of the plasmon resonances provide information on the particle's size, shape, composition, and local optical environment.

For non-metallic materials or semiconductors, they can be characterized by their band structure. It contains a band gap that represents the minimum energy difference between the top of the valence band and the bottom of the conduction band. The band gap can be determined using Ultraviolet-visible spectroscopy to predict the photochemical properties of the semiconductors.

=== Further characterization ===
In many cases, new solid compounds are further characterized by a variety of techniques that straddle the fine line that separates solid-state chemistry from solid-state physics. See Characterisation in material science for additional information.
