= Electric field gradient =

Rate of change of the electric field at an atomic nucleus

In atomic, molecular, and solid-state physics, the electric field gradient (EFG) measures the rate of change of the electric field at an atomic nucleus generated by the electronic charge distribution and the other nuclei. The EFG couples with the nuclear electric quadrupole moment of quadrupolar nuclei (those with spin quantum number greater than one-half) to generate an effect which can be measured using several spectroscopic methods, such as nuclear magnetic resonance (NMR), microwave spectroscopy, electron paramagnetic resonance (EPR, ESR), nuclear quadrupole resonance (NQR), Mössbauer spectroscopy or perturbed angular correlation (PAC). The EFG is non-zero only if the charges surrounding the nucleus violate cubic symmetry and therefore generate an inhomogeneous electric field at the position of the nucleus.

EFGs are highly sensitive to the electronic density in the immediate vicinity of a nucleus. This is because the EFG operator scales as r^{−3}, where r is the distance from a nucleus. This sensitivity has been used to study effects on charge distribution resulting from substitution, weak interactions, and charge transfer. Especially in crystals, the local structure can be investigated with above methods using the EFG's sensitivity to local changes, like defects or phase changes. In crystals the EFG is in the order of 10^{21}V/m^{2}. Density functional theory has become an important tool for methods of nuclear spectroscopy to calculate EFGs and provide a deeper understanding of specific EFGs in crystals from measurements.

== Definition ==
A given charge distribution of electrons and nuclei, ρ(r), generates an electrostatic potential V(r). The gradient of this potential is the negative of the electric field generated. The first derivatives of the field, or the second derivatives of the potential, is the electric field gradient. The nine components of the EFG are thus defined as the second partial derivatives of the electrostatic potential, evaluated at the position of a nucleus:

$$V_{ij} = \frac{\partial^2 V}{\partial x_i \partial x_j}.$$

For each nucleus, the components V_{ij} are combined as a symmetric 3 × 3 matrix. Under the assumption that the charge distribution generating the electrostatic potential is external to the nucleus, the matrix is traceless, for in that situation Laplace's equation, ∇^{2}V(r) = 0, holds. Relaxing this assumption, a more general form of the EFG tensor which retains the symmetry and traceless character is

$$\varphi_{ij}=V_{ij}-\frac{1}{3}\delta_{ij}\nabla^2V,$$

where ∇^{2}V(r) is evaluated at a given nucleus.

As V (and φ) is symmetric, it can be diagonalized. Different conventions exist for assigning the EFG tensor's principal components from the eigenvalues. In nuclear magnetic resonance spectroscopy, the Haeberlen convention is $|\lambda_c| > |\lambda_a| > |\lambda_b|$, in order to maintain consistency with the convention for the nuclear shielding tensor. In other fields, however, they are assigned $|\lambda_c| > |\lambda_b| > |\lambda_a|$, more usually denoted as $\vert V_{zz} \vert \geq \vert V_{yy} \vert \geq \vert V_{xx} \vert$, in order of decreasing modulus. Given the traceless character, $\lambda_a + \lambda_b > \lambda_c = 0$, only two of the principal components are independent. Typically these are described by $\lambda_c$ or V_{zz} and the biaxially parameter or asymmetry parameter, η, defined as

$$\eta = \frac{V_{xx} - V_{yy}}{V_{zz}} = \frac{\lambda_b - \lambda_a}{\lambda_c}.$$

where $0 \leq \eta \leq 1$.

Electric field gradient, as well as the biaxially parameter, can be evaluated numerically for large electric systems as shown in.
