= Nuclear spectroscopy =

Using nucleus properties to probe material properties

In materials science, a nuclear spectroscopy method is a method to probe material properties using properties of a nucleus. By emission or absorption of radiation from the nucleus information of the local structure is obtained, as an interaction of an atom with its closest neighbours. Or a radiation spectrum of the nucleus is detected. Most methods base on hyperfine interactions, which are the interaction of the nucleus with its interaction of its atom's electrons and their interaction with the nearest neighbor atoms as well as external fields. Nuclear spectroscopy is mainly applied to solids and liquids, rarely in gases. Its methods are important tools in condensed matter physics, solid state chemistry, and analysis of chemical composition (analytical chemistry).

== Methods ==
In nuclear physics these methods are used to study properties of the nucleus itself.

Methods for studies of the nucleus:

- Gamma spectroscopy
- Hypernuclear spectroscopy

Methods for condensed matter studies:

- Nuclear magnetic resonance (NMR)
- Mössbauer spectroscopy
- Perturbed angular correlation (PAC, TDPAC, PAC spectroscopy)
- Muon spin spectroscopy
- Nuclear orientation
- Channeling
- Nuclear reaction analysis
- Nuclear quadrupole resonance (NQR)
- Quasielastic neutron scattering (QENS)

Methods for trace element analysis:

- Neutron activation analysis (NAA)
- Associated particle imaging (API)
