= Associated particle imaging =

3D imaging technique using inelastic neutron scattering

Associated particle imaging (API), sometimes referred to as the tagged neutron method (TNM), is a three dimensional imaging technique that maps the distribution of elements within an object. In associated particle imaging, deuterium-tritium fusion reactions each produce a fast neutron and an associated particle (such as an alpha particle), which travel in opposite directions in the center-of-mass frame. By measuring the timing and position of the associated particle, the trajectory of the neutron may be inferred. The neutron may then enter an object of interest where it is likely to undergo inelastic scattering. This produces one or more gamma-rays of specific energies dependent on the element that the neutron scatters off of. By measuring the gamma-ray energy, the element may be identified. The timing of the gamma-ray coinciding with an associated particle allows the 3D imaging of an object's elemental composition. This technique has applications in agriculture (e.g. soil surveys), national security (counter-terrorism and weapons surveillance), and diamond detection, among other areas.

== Mechanism ==
A deuterium-tritium associated particle imaging system mainly consists of a deuterium accelerator, a target containing tritium, a detector sensitive to the position and timing of incoming alpha particles, and a gamma-ray detector. The object of interest is placed on one side of the target, perpendicular to the direction of the deuterium beam, and the alpha detector is placed on the other side.

The deuterium fuses with tritium in the target, producing a 14.1 MeV neutron and a 3.5 MeV alpha particle. The neutron and alpha particle fly in opposite directions with a known velocity. The alpha's position and time of arrival is measured. The neutron may enter into the object of interest and collide with a nucleus, putting the nucleus in an excited state. When the nucleus decays into its ground state, it emits one or more gamma-rays. The energy and timing of the gamma-ray(s) are measured by the gamma-ray detector. When an alpha particle and gamma-ray are observed within a very small window of time (under 80 ns), they are considered to originate from the same fusion reaction. The velocity of the neutron and gamma-ray are known, as is the trajectory of the associated alpha (and therefore the neutron), so the location of the neutron-nucleus interaction can be calculated. The energies of the gamma-rays are unique to a specific nucleus, and so may be used to identify the element involved in the interaction. Over many observed interactions, a three-dimensional mapping of elements within the object of interest is created.

The neutron production rate must be kept low enough to avoid random coincidences, i.e. two neutron-alpha pairs being created in the same coincidence window. In this scenario it is not possible to distinguish which gamma-ray came from which neutron. This establishes an upper limit on count rate, and therefore a lower limit on the time it takes to properly image an object.

While the angle between the neutron and alpha is 180 degrees for the center-of-mass frame, the angle is slightly smaller in the laboratory frame. Additionally, the deuterium beam contains ions with varying momenta, and so the center-of-mass velocity also varies for each reaction. These contribute to the uncertainty of the measurement, which may be partially corrected.

== Applications ==
Associated particle imaging has uses in basic science, notably in the accurate measurement of quantities related to neutron inelastic scattering for nuclear data studies.

In the context of national security, the technique is of interest due to its use in active interrogation. For example, shielded fissionable material, hazardous chemicals, and other concealed illicit materials may be identified and controlled.

Agriculture-related studies, such as those involving carbon sequestration, may employ associated particle imaging to measure the concentration of carbon in a soil sample with a certain volume. One can then extrapolate how much carbon is sequestered in the area that the sample was taken. This may be useful not only on Earth, but also in future planetary surface missions within the Solar System.
