= Local structure =

Close surroundings of an atom

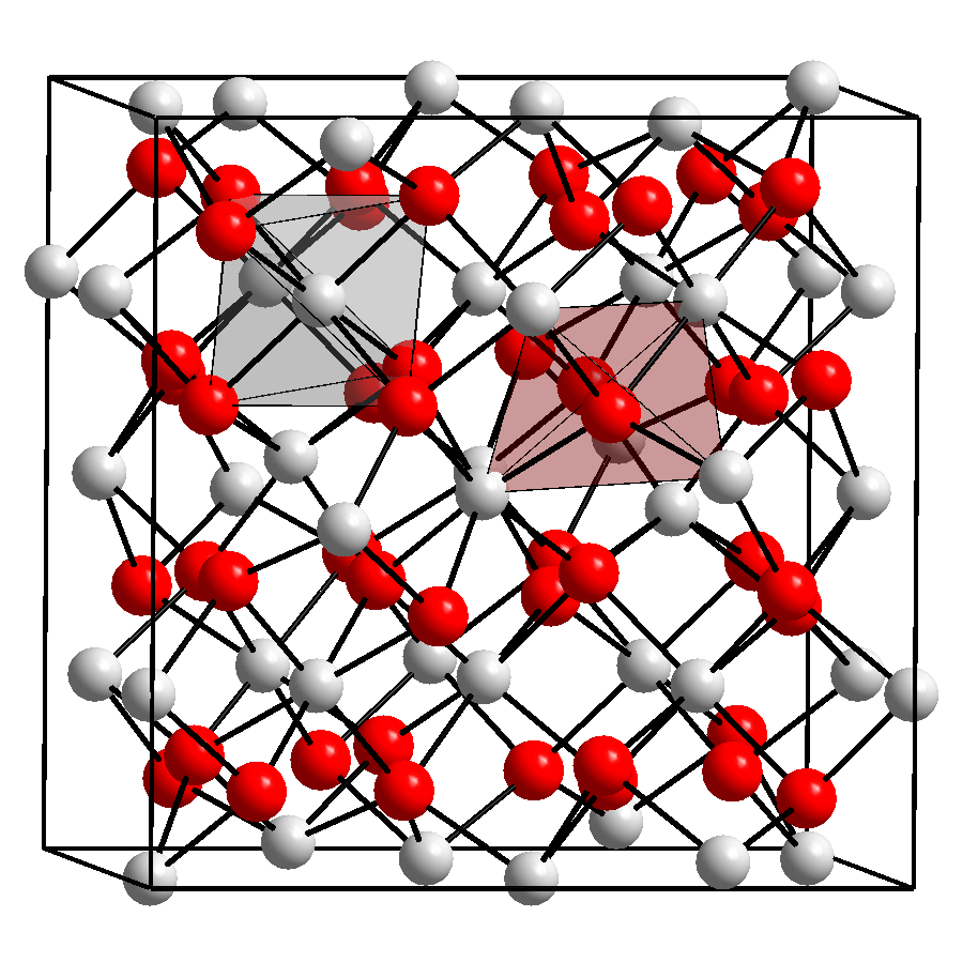
Crystal structure of indium(III) oxide

The local structure is a term in nuclear spectroscopy that refers to the structure of the nearest neighbours around an atom in crystals and molecules. E.g. in crystals the atoms order in a regular fashion on wide ranges to form even gigantic highly ordered crystals (Naica Mine). However, in reality, crystals are never perfect and have impurities or defects, which means that a foreign atom resides on a lattice site or in between lattice sites (interstitials). These small defects and impurities cannot be seen by methods such as X-ray diffraction or neutron diffraction, because these methods average in their nature of measurement over a large number of atoms and thus are insensitive to effects in local structure. Methods in nuclear spectroscopy use specific nuclei as probe. The nucleus of an atom is about 10,000 to 150,000 times smaller than the atom itself. It experiences the electric fields created by the atom's electrons that surround the nucleus. In addition, the electric fields created by neighbouring atoms also influence the fields that the nucleus experiences. The interactions between the nucleus and these fields are called hyperfine interactions that influence the nucleus' properties. The nucleus therefore becomes very sensitive to small changes in its hyperfine structure, which can be measured by methods of nuclear spectroscopy, such as e.g. nuclear magnetic resonance, Mössbauer spectroscopy, and perturbed angular correlation.

With the same methods, the local magnetic fields in a crystal structure can also be probed and provide a magnetic local structure. This is of great importance for the understanding of defects in magnetic materials, which have wide range of applications such as modern magnetic materials or the giant magnetoresistance effect, that is used in materials in the reader heads of harddrives.

Research of the local structure of materials has become an important tool for the understanding of properties especially in functional materials, such as used in electronics, chips, batteries, semiconductors, or solar cells. Many of those materials are defect materials and their specific properties are controlled by defects.
