= Curie–Weiss law =

Model of magnetic susceptibility under certain conditions

In magnetism, the Curie–Weiss law describes the magnetic susceptibility χ of a ferromagnet in the paramagnetic region above the Curie temperature:

$$\chi = \frac{C}{T - T_{\rm C}}$$

where C is a material-specific Curie constant, T is the absolute temperature, and T_{C} is the Curie temperature, both measured in kelvin. The law predicts a singularity in the susceptibility at T = T_{C}. Below this temperature, the ferromagnet has a spontaneous magnetization. It was developed by Pierre Weiss in 1907, extending Curie's law, named after Pierre Curie.

== Background ==
A magnetic moment which is present even in the absence of the external magnetic field is called spontaneous magnetization. Materials with this property are known as ferromagnets, such as iron, nickel, and magnetite. However, when these materials are heated up, at a certain temperature they lose their spontaneous magnetization, and become paramagnetic. This threshold temperature below which a material is ferromagnetic is called the Curie temperature and is different for each material.

The Curie–Weiss law describes the changes in a material's magnetic susceptibility, $\chi$, near its Curie temperature. The magnetic susceptibility is the ratio between the material's magnetization and the applied magnetic field.

== Limitations ==
In many materials, the Curie–Weiss law fails to describe the susceptibility in the immediate vicinity of the Curie point, since it is based on a mean-field approximation. Instead, there is a critical behavior of the form

$$\chi \propto \frac{1}{(T - T_{\rm C})^\gamma}$$

with the critical exponent γ. However, at temperatures T ≫ T_{C} the expression of the Curie–Weiss law still holds true, but with T_{C} replaced by a temperature Θ that is somewhat higher than the actual Curie temperature. Some authors call Θ the Weiss constant to distinguish it from the temperature of the actual Curie point.

== Classical approaches to magnetic susceptibility and Bohr–van Leeuwen theorem ==
According to the Bohr–van Leeuwen theorem, when statistical mechanics and classical mechanics are applied consistently, the thermal average of the magnetization is always zero. Magnetism cannot be explained without quantum mechanics. That means that it can not be explained without taking into account that matter consists of atoms. Next are listed some semi-classical approaches to it, using a simple atom model, as they are easy to understand and relate to even though they are not perfectly correct.

The magnetic moment of a free atom is due to the orbital angular momentum and spin of its electrons and nucleus. When the atoms are such that their shells are completely filled, they do not have any net magnetic dipole moment in the absence of an external magnetic field. When present, such a field distorts the trajectories (classical concept) of the electrons so that the applied field could be opposed as predicted by the Lenz's law. In other words, the net magnetic dipole induced by the external field is in the opposite direction, and such materials are repelled by it. These are called diamagnetic materials.

Sometimes an atom has a net magnetic dipole moment even in the absence of an external magnetic field. The contributions of the individual electrons and nucleus to the total angular momentum do not cancel each other. This happens when the shells of the atoms are not fully filled up (Hund's Rule). A collection of such atoms however, may not have any net magnetic moment as these dipoles are not aligned. An external magnetic field may serve to align them to some extent and develop a net magnetic moment per volume. Such alignment is temperature dependent as thermal agitation acts to disorient the dipoles. Such materials are called paramagnetic.

In some materials, the atoms (with net magnetic dipole moments) can interact with each other to align themselves even in the absence of any external magnetic field when the thermal agitation is low enough. Alignment could be parallel (ferromagnetism) or anti-parallel. In the case of anti-parallel, the dipole moments may or may not cancel each other (antiferromagnetism, ferrimagnetism).

== Density matrix approach to magnetic susceptibility ==
We take a very simple situation in which each atom can be approximated as a two state system. The thermal energy is so low that the atom is in the ground state. In this ground state, the atom is assumed to have no net orbital angular momentum but only one unpaired electron to give it a spin of the half. In the presence of an external magnetic field, the ground state will split into two states having an energy difference proportional to the applied field. The spin of the unpaired electron is parallel to the field in the higher energy state and anti-parallel in the lower one.

A density matrix, $\rho$, is a matrix that describes a quantum system in a mixed state, a statistical ensemble of several quantum states (here several similar 2-state atoms). This should be contrasted with a single state vector that describes a quantum system in a pure state. The expectation value of a measurement, $A$, over the ensemble is $\langle A \rangle = \operatorname{Tr} (A \rho)$. In terms of a complete set of states, $|i\rangle$, one can write

$$\rho = \sum_{ij}
\rho_{ij} |i\rangle \langle j| .$$

Von Neumann's equation tells us how the density matrix evolves with time.

$$i \hbar \frac d {dt} \rho (t) = [H, \rho(t)]$$

In equilibrium, one has $[H, \rho] = 0$, and the allowed density matrices are $f(H)$. The canonical ensemble has $\rho = \exp(-H/T)/Z$, where $Z =\operatorname{Tr} \exp(-H/T)$.

For the 2-state system, we can write $H = -\gamma \hbar B \sigma_3$. Here $\gamma$ is the gyromagnetic ratio. Hence $Z = 2 \cosh(\gamma \hbar B/(2T))$, and

$$\rho(B,T) = \frac 1 {2 \cosh(\gamma \hbar B/(2T))}
\begin{pmatrix}
\exp (-\gamma \hbar B/(2T)) & 0 \\
0 & \exp (\gamma \hbar B/(2T))
\end{pmatrix}.$$

From which

$$\langle J_x \rangle =
\langle J_y \rangle = 0,
\langle J_z \rangle = - \frac \hbar 2 \tanh (\gamma \hbar B/(2T)).$$

== Explanation of para and diamagnetism using perturbation theory ==
In the presence of a uniform external magnetic field $B$ along the z-direction, the Hamiltonian of the atom changes by

$$\Delta H = \alpha J_z B + \beta B^2 \sum_i (x_i^2 + y_i^2 ),$$

where $\alpha, \beta$ are positive real numbers which are independent of which atom we are looking at but depend on the mass and the charge of the electron. $i$ corresponds to individual electrons of the atom.

We apply second order perturbation theory to this situation. This is justified by the fact that even for highest presently attainable field strengths, the shifts in the energy level due to $\Delta H$ is quite small w.r.t. atomic excitation energies. Degeneracy of the original Hamiltonian is handled by choosing a basis which diagonalizes $\Delta H$ in the degenerate subspaces. Let $|n\rangle$ be such a basis for the state of the atom (rather the electrons in the atom). Let $\Delta E_n$ be the change in energy in $|n \rangle$. So we get

$$\Delta E_n = \langle n | \Delta H | n \rangle + \sum_{m, E_m \neq E_n}
\frac
{| \langle n | \Delta H | m \rangle |^2}
{E_n - E_m}
.$$

In our case we can ignore $B^3$ and higher order terms. We get

$$\Delta E_n = \alpha B \langle n | J_z | n \rangle
+
\alpha^2 B^2 \sum_{m, E_m \neq E_n}
\frac
{| \langle n | J_z | m \rangle |^2}
{E_n - E_m}
+
\beta
B^2 \sum_i \langle n | x_i^2 + y_i^2 | n \rangle
.$$

In case of diamagnetic material, the first two terms are absent as they don't have any angular momentum in their ground state. In case of paramagnetic material all the three terms contribute.

== Adding spin–spin interaction in the Hamiltonian: Ising model ==
So far, we have assumed that the atoms do not interact with each other. Even though this is a reasonable assumption in the case of diamagnetic and paramagnetic substances, this assumption fails in the case of ferromagnetism, where the spins of the atom try to align with each other to the extent permitted by the thermal agitation. In this case, we have to consider the Hamiltonian of the ensemble of the atom. Such a Hamiltonian will contain all the terms described above for individual atoms and terms corresponding to the interaction among the pairs of the atom. Ising model is one of the simplest approximations of such pairwise interaction.

$$H_{\text{pairs}} =
- \frac 1 2
\sum_{R,R'}
S(R) \cdot S(R') J (R - R')$$

Here the two atoms of a pair are at $R, R'$. Their interaction $J$ is determined by their distance vector $R - R'$. In order to simplify the calculation, it is often assumed that interaction happens between neighboring atoms only and $J$ is a constant. The effect of such interaction is often approximated as a mean field and, in our case, the Weiss field.

== Modification of Curie's law due to Weiss field ==
The Curie–Weiss law is an adapted version of Curie's law, which for a paramagnetic material may be written in SI units as follows, assuming $\chi \ll 1$:
$$\chi = \frac{M}{H} \approx \frac{M \mu_0}{B} =\frac{C}{T} .$$

Here μ_{0} is the permeability of free space; M the magnetization (magnetic moment per unit volume), B = μ_{0}H is the magnetic field, and C the material-specific Curie constant:
$$C = \frac{\mu_0 \mu_{\rm B}^2}{3 k_{\rm B}}N g^2 J(J+1),$$
where k_{B} is the Boltzmann constant, N the number of magnetic atoms (or molecules) per unit volume, g the Landé g-factor, μ_{B} the Bohr magneton, J the angular momentum quantum number.

For the Curie-Weiss Law the total magnetic field is B + λM where λ is the Weiss molecular field constant and then
$$\chi =\frac{M \mu_0}{B} \rightarrow \frac{M \mu_0}{B+\lambda M} =\frac{C}{T}$$
which can be rearranged to get
$$\chi = \frac{C}{T - \frac{C \lambda }{\mu_0}}$$
which is the Curie-Weiss Law
$$\chi = \frac{C}{T - T_{\rm C}}$$
where the Curie temperature T_{C} is
$$T_{\rm C} = \frac{C \lambda }{\mu_0}$$

== See also ==
- Curie's law
- Paramagnetism
- Pierre Curie
- Pierre-Ernest Weiss
- Exchange interaction
