= Van Vleck paramagnetism =

Magnetic property

In condensed matter and atomic physics, Van Vleck paramagnetism refers to a positive and temperature-independent contribution to the magnetic susceptibility of a material, derived from second order corrections to the Zeeman interaction. The quantum mechanical theory was developed by John Hasbrouck Van Vleck between the 1920s and the 1930s to explain the magnetic response of gaseous nitric oxide (NO) and of rare-earth salts. Alongside other magnetic effects like Paul Langevin's formulas for paramagnetism (Curie's law) and diamagnetism, Van Vleck discovered an additional paramagnetic contribution of the same order as Langevin's diamagnetism. Van Vleck contribution is usually important for systems with one electron short of being half filled and this contribution vanishes for elements with closed shells.

== Description ==
The magnetization of a material under an external small magnetic field $\mathbf{H}$ is approximately described by

$$\mathbf{M}=\chi\mathbf{H}$$

where $\chi$ is the magnetic susceptibility. When a magnetic field is applied to a paramagnetic material, its magnetization is parallel to the magnetic field and $\chi>0$. For a diamagnetic material, the magnetization opposes the field, and $\chi<0$.

Experimental measurements show that most non-magnetic materials have a susceptibility that behaves in the following way:

$$\chi(T)\approx \frac{C_0}{T}+\chi_0$$,

where $T$ is the absolute temperature; $C_0,\chi_0$ are constant, and $C_0\ge0$, while $\chi_0$ can be positive, negative or null. Van Vleck paramagnetism often refers to systems where $C_0\approx 0$ and $\chi_0>0$.

== Derivation ==
The Hamiltonian for an electron in a static homogeneous magnetic field $\mathbf{H}$ in an atom is usually composed of three terms

$$\mathcal{H}=\mathcal{H}_0+\mu_0\frac{\mu_{\rm B}}{\hbar}(\mathbf{L}+g\mathbf{S})\cdot\mathbf{H}+\mu_0^2\frac{e^2}{8m_{\rm e}}r^2_{\perp} H^2$$

where $\mu_0$ is the vacuum permeability, $\mu_{\rm B}$ is the Bohr magneton, $g$ is the g-factor, $e$ is the elementary charge, $m_{\rm e}$ is the electron mass, $\mathbf{L}$ is the orbital angular momentum operator, $\mathbf{S}$ the spin and $r_\perp$ is the component of the position operator orthogonal to the magnetic field. The Hamiltonian has three terms, the first one $\mathcal{H}_0$ is the unperturbed Hamiltonian without the magnetic field, the second one is proportional to $\mathbf{H}$, and the third one is proportional to $H^2$. In order to obtain the ground state of the system, one can treat $\mathcal{H}_0$ exactly, and treat the magnetic field dependent terms using perturbation theory. Note that for strong magnetic fields, Paschen-Back effect dominates.

=== First order perturbation theory ===
First order perturbation theory on the second term of the Hamiltonian (proportional to $H$) for electrons bound to an atom, gives a positive correction to energy given by

$$\Delta E^{(1)}=\mu_0\frac{\mu_{\rm B}}{\hbar}\langle \mathrm g| (\mathbf{L}+g\mathbf{S})\cdot \mathbf H|\mathrm{g}\rangle =g_J\mu_0\frac{\mu_{\rm B}}{\hbar} \langle \mathrm g| \mathbf{J}\cdot \mathbf H|\mathrm{g}\rangle$$

where $|\mathrm g\rangle$ is the ground state, $g_J$ is the Landé g-factor of the ground state and $\mathbf{J}=\mathbf{L}+\mathbf{S}$ is the total angular momentum operator (see Wigner–Eckart theorem). This correction leads to what is known as Langevin paramagnetism (the quantum theory is sometimes called Brillouin paramagnetism), that leads to a positive magnetic susceptibility. For sufficiently large temperatures, this contribution is described by Curie's law:

$$\chi_{\rm Curie}\approx \frac{C_1}{T}$$,

a susceptibility that is inversely proportional to the temperature $T$, where $C_0\approx C_1$ is the material dependent Curie constant. If the ground state has no total angular momentum there is no Curie contribution and other terms dominate.

The first perturbation theory on the third term of the Hamiltonian (proportional to $H^2$), leads to a negative response (magnetization that opposes the magnetic field). Usually known as Larmor or Langevin diamagnetism:

$$\chi_{\rm Larmor}=-C_2\langle r^2\rangle$$

where $C_2$ is another constant proportional to $n$ the number of atoms per unit volume, and $\langle r^2 \rangle$ is the mean squared radius of the atom. Note that Larmor susceptibility does not depend on the temperature.

=== Second order: Van Vleck susceptibility ===
While Curie and Larmor susceptibilities were well understood from experimental measurements, J.H. Van Vleck noticed that the calculation above was incomplete. If $H$ is taken as the perturbation parameter, the calculation must include all orders of perturbation up to the same power of $H$. As Larmor diamagnetism comes from first order perturbation of the $H^2$, one must calculate second order perturbation of the $B$ term:

$$\Delta E^{\rm (2)}=\left(\frac{\mu_0 \mu_{\rm B}}{\hbar}\right)^2\sum_i\frac{|\langle \mathrm{g}|(\mathbf{L}+g\mathbf{S})\cdot \mathbf H|\mathrm{e}_i\rangle|^2}{E^{(0)}_\mathrm{g}-E^{(0)}_{\mathrm{e},i}}$$

where the sum goes over all excited degenerate states $|\mathrm{e}_i\rangle$, and $E^{(0)}_{\mathrm{e},i},E^{(0)}_\mathrm{g}$ are the energies of the excited states and the ground state, respectively, the sum excludes the state $i=0$, where $|\mathrm{e}_{0}\rangle=|\mathrm{g}\rangle$. Historically, J.H. Van Vleck called this term the "high frequency matrix elements".

In this way, Van Vleck susceptibility comes from the second order energy correction, and can be written as

$$\chi_{\rm VV}=2n\mu_0\left(\frac{\mu_{\rm B}}{\hbar}\right)^2\sum_{i(i\neq 0)}\frac{g_j^2|\langle \mathrm{g}|L_z+gS_z|\mathrm{e}_i\rangle|^2}{E_{\mathrm{e},i}-E_{\rm g}},$$

where $n$ is the number density, and $S_z$ and $L_z$ are the projection of the spin and orbital angular momentum in the direction of the magnetic field, respectively.

In this way, $\chi_0\approx\chi_{\rm VV}+\chi_{\rm Larmor}$, as the signs of Larmor and Van Vleck susceptibilities are opposite, the sign of $\chi_0$ depends on the specific properties of the material.

== General formula and Van Vleck criteria ==
For a more general system (molecules, complex systems), the paramagnetic susceptibility for an ensemble of independent magnetic moments can be written as

$$\chi_{\rm para}=\mu_0\mu_{\rm B}^2\frac{n}{\sum_{i} p_i} \sum_{i} p_i\left[\frac{\left(W^{(1)}_i\right)^2}{k T} - 2  W^{(2)}_i\right]\;;\;p_i=\exp\left(-\frac{E_i^{(0)}}{k T}\right),$$

where

$$W_i^{(1)}=g_J^{(i)}\langle \mathrm{e}_i|J_z| \mathrm{e}_i\rangle/\hbar$$,

$$W_i^{\rm (2)}=\frac{1}{\hbar^2}\sum_{k(k\neq i)}\frac{|\langle \mathrm{e}_i|L_z+gS_z|\mathrm{e}_k\rangle|^2}{\delta E_{i,k}}\;;\;\delta E_{i,k}=E^{(0)}_{\mathrm{e},i}-E^{(0)}_{\mathrm{e},k}$$,

and $g_J^{(i)}$ is the Landé g-factor of state i. Van Vleck summarizes the results of this formula in four cases, depending on the temperature:

1. if all $|\delta E_{i,k}|\ll k_{\rm B}T$, where $k_{\rm B}$ is Boltzmann constant, the susceptibility follows Curie law: $\chi_{\rm para}\propto1/T$;
2. if all $|\delta E_{i,k}|\gg k_{\rm B}T$, the susceptibility is independent of the temperature;
3. if all $|\delta E_{i,k}|$ is either $\gg k_{\rm B}T$ or $\ll k_{\rm B}T$, the susceptibility has a mixed behavior and $\chi_{\rm para}\propto1/T+c,$ where $c$ is a constant;
4. if all $|\delta E_{i,k}|\approx k_{\rm B}T$, there is no simple dependence on $T$.

While molecular oxygen O_{2} and nitric oxide NO are similar paramagnetic gases, O_{2} follows Curie law as in case (a), while NO, deviates slightly from it. In 1927, Van Vleck considered NO to be in case (d) and obtained a more precise prediction of its susceptibility using the formula above.

== Systems of interest ==
The standard example of Van Vleck paramagnetism are europium(III) oxide (Eu_{2}O_{3}) salts where there are six 4f electrons in trivalent europium ions. The ground state of Eu^{3+} that has a total azimuthal quantum number $j=0$ and Curie's contribution ($C_0/T$) vanishes, the first excited state with $j=1$ is very close to the ground state at 330 K and contributes through second order corrections as showed by Van Vleck. A similar effect is observed in samarium salts (Sm^{3+} ions). In the actinides, Van Vleck paramagnetism is also important in Bk^{5+} and Cm^{4+} which have a localized 5f_{6} configuration.
