= Curie temperature =

Temperature above which magnetic properties change

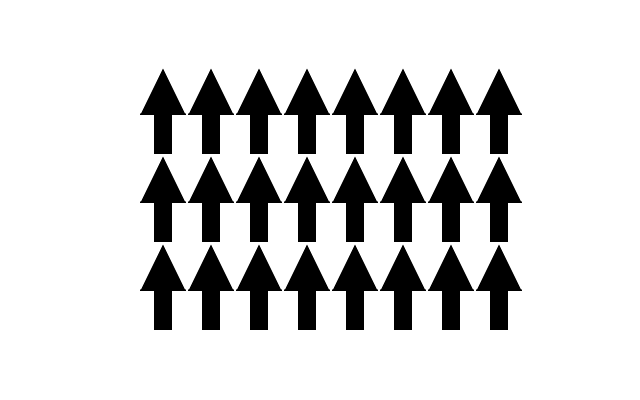
Figure 1. Below the Curie temperature, neighbouring magnetic spins align parallel to each other in a ferromagnet in the absence of an applied magnetic field.

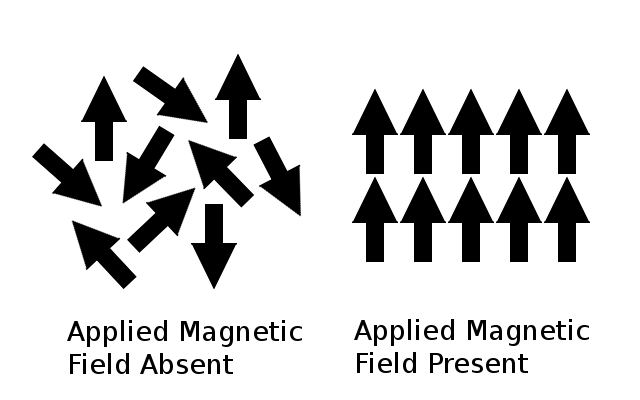
Figure 2. Above the Curie temperature, the magnetic spins are randomly aligned in a paramagnet unless a magnetic field is applied.

In physics and materials science, the Curie temperature (T_{C}), or Curie point, is the temperature above which certain materials lose their permanent magnetic properties, which can (in most cases) be replaced by induced magnetism. The Curie temperature is named after Pierre Curie, who showed that magnetism is lost at a critical temperature.

The force of magnetism is determined by the magnetic moment, a dipole moment within an atom that originates from the angular momentum and spin of electrons. Materials have different structures of intrinsic magnetic moments that depend on temperature; the Curie temperature is the critical point at which a material's intrinsic magnetic moments change direction.

Permanent magnetism is caused by the alignment of magnetic moments, and induced magnetism is created when disordered magnetic moments are forced to align in an applied magnetic field. For example, the ordered magnetic moments (ferromagnetic, Figure 1) change and become disordered (paramagnetic, Figure 2) at the Curie temperature. Higher temperatures make magnets weaker, as spontaneous magnetism only occurs below the Curie temperature. Magnetic susceptibility above the Curie temperature can be calculated from the Curie–Weiss law, which is derived from Curie's law.

In analogy to ferromagnetic and paramagnetic materials, the Curie temperature can also be used to describe the phase transition between ferroelectricity and paraelectricity. In this context, the order parameter is the electric polarization that goes from a finite value to zero when the temperature is increased above the Curie temperature.

The Curie points of various materials
Material	Curie temperature in		
Material	K	°C	°F
Iron (Fe)	1043–1664	770	1418
Cobalt (Co)	1400	1130	2060
Nickel (Ni)	627	354	669
Gadolinium (Gd)	293.2	20.1	68.1
Dysprosium (Dy)	88	−185.2	−301.3
Manganese bismuthide (MnBi)	630	357	674
Manganese antimonide (MnSb)	587	314	597
Chromium(IV) oxide (CrO_{2})	386	113	235
Manganese arsenide (MnAs)	318	45	113
Europium(II) oxide (EuO)	69	−204.2	−335.5
Iron(III) oxide (Fe_{2}O_{3})	948	675	1247
Iron(II,III) oxide (FeOFe_{2}O_{3})	858	585	1085
NiO–Fe_{2}O_{3}	858	585	1085
CuO–Fe_{2}O_{3}	728	455	851
MgO–Fe_{2}O_{3}	713	440	824
MnO–Fe_{2}O_{3}	573	300	572
Yttrium iron garnet (Y_{3}Fe_{5}O_{12})	560	287	548
Neodymium magnets	583–673	310–400	590–752
Alnico	973–1133	700–860	1292–1580
Samarium–cobalt magnets	993–1073	720–800	1328–1472
Strontium ferrite	723	450	842

== History ==
That heating destroys magnetism was already described in De Magnete (1600):

Iron filings, after being heated for a long time, are attracted by a loadstone, yet not so strongly or from so great a distance as when not heated. A loadstone loses some of its virtue by too great a heat; for its humour is set free, whence its peculiar nature is marred. (Book 2, Chapter 23).

in 1895, Pierre Curie used strong magnets and precision balances to study the magnetic phase transition (now called the Curie point or Curie temperature). He also proposed the Curie's law.

In 1911, Pierre Weiss derived his Curie–Weiss law to explain this transition.

== Magnetic moments ==
At the atomic level, there are two contributors to the magnetic moment, the electron magnetic moment and the nuclear magnetic moment. Of these two terms, the electron magnetic moment dominates, and the nuclear magnetic moment is insignificant. At higher temperatures, electrons have higher thermal energy. This has a randomizing effect on aligned magnetic domains, leading to the disruption of order, and the phenomenon of the Curie point.

Ferromagnetic, paramagnetic, ferrimagnetic, and antiferromagnetic materials have different intrinsic magnetic moment structures. At a material's specific Curie temperature (T_{C}), these properties change. The transition from antiferromagnetic to paramagnetic (or vice versa) occurs at the Néel temperature (T_{N}), which is analogous to Curie temperature.

Below T_{C}	Above T_{C}
Ferromagnetic	↔ Paramagnetic
Ferrimagnetic	↔ Paramagnetic
Below T_{N}	Above T_{N}
Antiferromagnetic	↔ Paramagnetic

Orientations of magnetic moments in materials

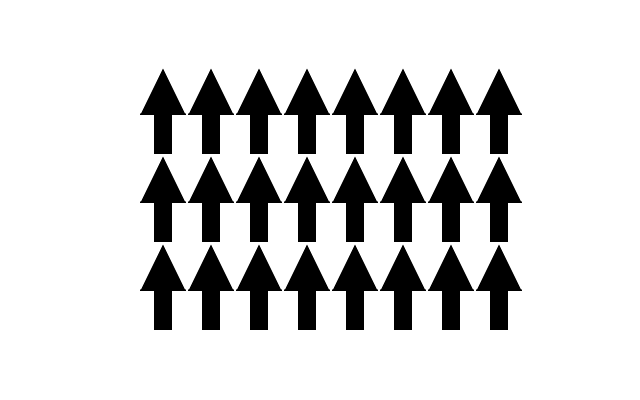
Ferromagnetism: The magnetic moments in a ferromagnetic material are ordered and of the same magnitude in the absence of an applied magnetic field.

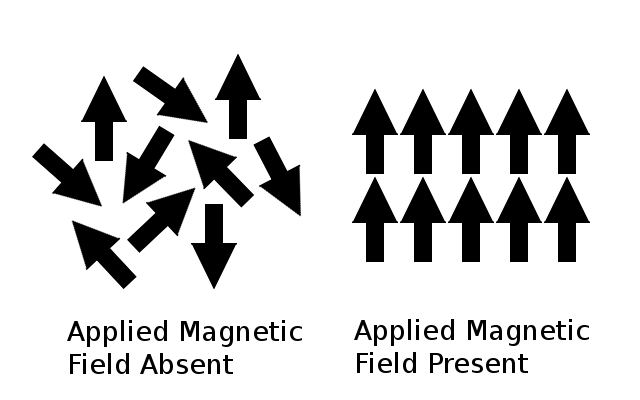
Paramagnetism: The magnetic moments in a paramagnetic material are disordered in the absence of an applied magnetic field and ordered in the presence of an applied magnetic field.

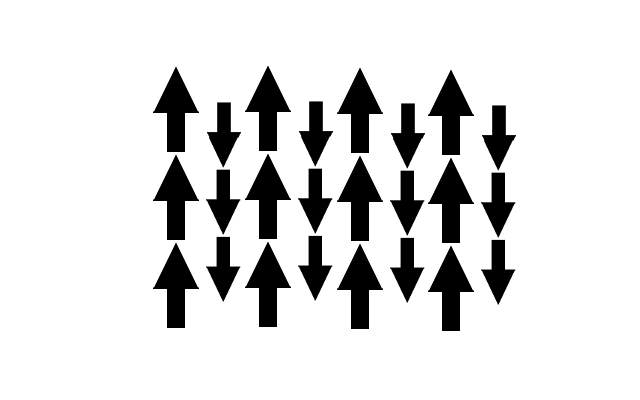
Ferrimagnetism: The magnetic moments in a ferrimagnetic material have different magnitudes (due to the crystal containing two different types of magnetic ions) which are aligned oppositely in the absence of an applied magnetic field.

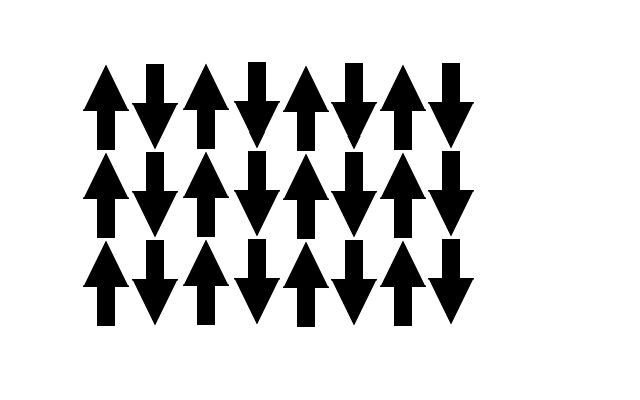
Antiferromagnetism: The magnetic moments in an antiferromagnetic material have the same magnitudes but are aligned oppositely in the absence of an applied magnetic field.

== Materials with magnetic moments that change properties at the Curie temperature ==
Ferromagnetic, paramagnetic, ferrimagnetic, and antiferromagnetic structures are made up of intrinsic magnetic moments. If all the electrons within the structure are paired, these moments cancel out due to their opposite spins and angular momenta. Thus, even with an applied magnetic field, these materials have different properties and no Curie temperature.

=== Paramagnetic ===
A material is paramagnetic only above its Curie temperature. Paramagnetic materials are non-magnetic when a magnetic field is absent and magnetic when a magnetic field is applied. When a magnetic field is absent, the material has disordered magnetic moments; that is, the magnetic moments are asymmetrical and not aligned. When a magnetic field is present, the magnetic moments are temporarily realigned parallel to the applied field; the magnetic moments are symmetrical and aligned. The magnetic moments being aligned in the same direction are what causes an induced magnetic field.

For paramagnetism, this response to an applied magnetic field is positive and is known as magnetic susceptibility. The magnetic susceptibility only applies above the Curie temperature for disordered states.

Sources of paramagnetism (materials which have Curie temperatures) include:

- All atoms that have unpaired electrons;
- Atoms that have inner shells that are incomplete in electrons;
- Free radicals;
- Metals.

Above the Curie temperature, the atoms are excited, and the spin orientations become randomized but can be realigned by an applied field, i.e., the material becomes paramagnetic. Below the Curie temperature, the intrinsic structure has undergone a phase transition, the atoms are ordered, and the material is ferromagnetic. The paramagnetic materials' induced magnetic fields are very weak compared with ferromagnetic materials' magnetic fields.

=== Ferromagnetic ===
Materials are only ferromagnetic below their corresponding Curie temperatures. Ferromagnetic materials are magnetic in the absence of an applied magnetic field.

When a magnetic field is absent the material has spontaneous magnetization which is a result of the ordered magnetic moments; that is, for ferromagnetism, the atoms are symmetrical and aligned in the same direction creating a permanent magnetic field.

The magnetic interactions are held together by exchange interactions; otherwise thermal disorder would overcome the weak interactions of magnetic moments. The exchange interaction has a zero probability of parallel electrons occupying the same point in time, implying a preferred parallel alignment in the material. The Boltzmann factor contributes heavily as it prefers interacting particles to be aligned in the same direction. This causes ferromagnets to have strong magnetic fields and high Curie temperatures of around 1,000 K (730 °C).

Below the Curie temperature, the atoms are aligned and parallel, causing spontaneous magnetism; the material is ferromagnetic. Above the Curie temperature the material is paramagnetic, as the atoms lose their ordered magnetic moments when the material undergoes a phase transition.

=== Ferrimagnetic ===
Materials are only ferrimagnetic below their corresponding Curie temperature. Ferrimagnetic materials are magnetic in the absence of an applied magnetic field and are made up of two different ions.

When a magnetic field is absent the material has a spontaneous magnetism which is the result of ordered magnetic moments; that is, for ferrimagnetism one ion's magnetic moments are aligned facing in one direction with certain magnitude and the other ion's magnetic moments are aligned facing in the opposite direction with a different magnitude. As the magnetic moments are of different magnitudes in opposite directions there is still a spontaneous magnetism and a magnetic field is present.

Similar to ferromagnetic materials the magnetic interactions are held together by exchange interactions. The orientations of moments however are anti-parallel which results in a net momentum by subtracting their momentum from one another.

Below the Curie temperature the atoms of each ion are aligned anti-parallel with different momentums causing a spontaneous magnetism; the material is ferrimagnetic. Above the Curie temperature the material is paramagnetic as the atoms lose their ordered magnetic moments as the material undergoes a phase transition.

=== Antiferromagnetic and the Néel temperature ===
Materials are only antiferromagnetic below their corresponding Néel temperature or magnetic ordering temperature, T_{N}. This is similar to the Curie temperature, since above the Néel temperature the material undergoes a phase transition and becomes paramagnetic. That is, the thermal energy becomes large enough to destroy the microscopic magnetic ordering within the material. It is named after Louis Néel (1904–2000), who received the 1970 Nobel Prize in Physics for his work in the area.

The material has equal magnetic moments aligned in opposite directions resulting in a zero magnetic moment and a net magnetism of zero at all temperatures below the Néel temperature. Antiferromagnetic materials are weakly magnetic in the absence or presence of an applied magnetic field.

Similar to ferromagnetic materials the magnetic interactions are held together by exchange interactions preventing thermal disorder from overcoming the weak interactions of magnetic moments. When disorder occurs it is at the Néel temperature.

Listed below are the Néel temperatures of several materials:

Substance	Néel temperature (K)
MnO	116
MnS	160
MnTe	307
MnF_{2}	67
FeF_{2}	79
FeCl_{2}	24
FeI_{2}	9
FeO	198
FeOCl	80
CrCl_{2}	25
CrI_{2}	12
CoO	291
NiCl_{2}	50
NiI_{2}	75
NiO	525
KFeO_{2}	983
Cr	308
Cr_{2}O_{3}	307
Nd_{5}Ge_{3}	50

== Curie–Weiss law ==
The Curie–Weiss law is an adapted version of Curie's law.

The Curie–Weiss law is a simple model derived from a mean-field approximation, this means it works well for the materials temperature, T, much greater than their corresponding Curie temperature, T_{C}, i.e. T ≫ T_{C}; it however fails to describe the magnetic susceptibility, χ, in the immediate vicinity of the Curie point because of correlations in the fluctuations of neighboring magnetic moments.

Neither Curie's law nor the Curie–Weiss law holds for T < T_{C}.

Curie's law for a paramagnetic material:

$$\chi = \frac{M}{H} =\frac{M \mu_0}{B} =\frac{C}{T}$$

Definition
χ	the magnetic susceptibility; the influence of an applied magnetic field on a material
M	the magnetic moments per unit volume
H	the macroscopic magnetic field
B	the magnetic field
C	the material-specific Curie constant

The Curie constant C is defined as
$$C = \frac{\mu_0 \mu_\mathrm{B}^2}{3 k_\mathrm{B}}N_\text{A} g^2 J(J+1)$$

$N_\text{A}$	the Avogadro constant
µ_{0}	the permeability of free space. Note: in CGS units is taken to equal one.
g	the Landé g-factor
J(J + 1)	the eigenvalue for eigenstate J^{2} for the stationary states within the incomplete atoms shells (electrons unpaired)
µ_{B}	the Bohr magneton
k_{B}	the Boltzmann constant
total magnetism	is N number of magnetic moments per unit volume

The Curie–Weiss law is then derived from Curie's law to be:

$$\chi = \frac{C}{T-T_\mathrm{C}}$$

where:

$$T_\mathrm{C} = \frac{C \lambda }{\mu_0}$$

λ is the Weiss molecular field constant.

For full derivation see Curie–Weiss law.

== Physics ==
=== Approaching Curie temperature from above ===
As the Curie–Weiss law is an approximation, a more accurate model is needed when the temperature, T, approaches the material's Curie temperature, T_{C}.

Magnetic susceptibility occurs above the Curie temperature.

An accurate model of critical behaviour for magnetic susceptibility with critical exponent γ:

$$\chi \sim \frac{1}{{\left(T - T_\mathrm{C}\right)}^\gamma}$$

The critical exponent differs between materials and for the mean-field model is taken as γ = 1.

As temperature is inversely proportional to magnetic susceptibility, when T approaches T_{C} the denominator tends to zero and the magnetic susceptibility approaches infinity allowing magnetism to occur. This is a spontaneous magnetism which is a property of ferromagnetic and ferrimagnetic materials.

=== Approaching Curie temperature from below ===
Temperature dependence of hyperfine splitting, which is a proxy for magnetization. Measured in cobalt by quasielastic neutron scattering. In the inset, a log-log plot versus Tc-T, the critical power law appears as a straight line.

Magnetism depends on temperature and spontaneous magnetism occurs below the Curie temperature. An accurate model of critical behaviour for spontaneous magnetism with critical exponent β:

$$M \sim (T_\mathrm{C} - T)^\beta$$

The critical exponent differs between materials and for the mean-field model as taken as β = 1/2 where T ≪ T_{C}.

The spontaneous magnetism approaches zero as the temperature increases towards the materials Curie temperature.

=== Approaching absolute zero (0 kelvin) ===
The spontaneous magnetism, occurring in ferromagnetic, ferrimagnetic, and antiferromagnetic materials, approaches zero as the temperature increases towards the material's Curie temperature. Spontaneous magnetism is at its maximum as the temperature approaches 0 K. That is, the magnetic moments are completely aligned and at their strongest magnitude of magnetism due to lack of thermal disturbance.

In paramagnetic materials thermal energy is sufficient to overcome the ordered alignments. As the temperature approaches 0 K, the entropy decreases to zero, that is, the disorder decreases and the material becomes ordered. This occurs without the presence of an applied magnetic field and obeys the third law of thermodynamics.

Both Curie's law and the Curie–Weiss law fail as the temperature approaches 0 K. This is because they depend on the magnetic susceptibility, which only applies when the state is disordered.

Gadolinium sulfate continues to satisfy Curie's law at 1 K. Between 0 and 1 K the law fails to hold and a sudden change in the intrinsic structure occurs at the Curie temperature.

=== Ising model of phase transitions ===
The Ising model is mathematically based and can analyse the critical points of phase transitions in ferromagnetic order due to spins of electrons having magnitudes of ±1/2. The spins interact with their neighbouring dipole electrons in the structure and here the Ising model can predict their behaviour with each other.

This model is important for solving and understanding the concepts of phase transitions and hence solving the Curie temperature. As a result, many different dependencies that affect the Curie temperature can be analysed.

For example, the surface and bulk properties depend on the alignment and magnitude of spins and the Ising model can determine the effects of magnetism in this system.

One should note, in 1D the Curie (critical) temperature for a magnetic order phase transition is found to be at zero temperature, i.e. the magnetic order takes over only at T = 0. In 2D, the critical temperature, e.g. a finite magnetization, can be calculated by solving the inequality:

$$M = (1- \sinh^{-4}(2 \beta J))^{1/8} > 0.$$

=== Weiss domains and surface and bulk Curie temperatures ===
Figure 3. The Weiss domains in a ferromagnetic material; the magnetic moments are aligned in domains.

Materials structures consist of intrinsic magnetic moments which are separated into domains called Weiss domains. This can result in ferromagnetic materials having no spontaneous magnetism as domains could potentially balance each other out. The position of particles can therefore have different orientations around the surface than the main part (bulk) of the material. This property directly affects the Curie temperature as there can be a bulk Curie temperature T_{B} and a different surface Curie temperature T_{S} for a material.

This allows for the surface Curie temperature to be ferromagnetic above the bulk Curie temperature when the main state is disordered, i.e. ordered and disordered states occur simultaneously.

The surface and bulk properties can be predicted by the Ising model and electron capture spectroscopy can be used to detect the electron spins and hence the magnetic moments on the surface of the material. An average total magnetism is taken from the bulk and surface temperatures to calculate the Curie temperature from the material, noting the bulk contributes more.

The angular momentum of an electron is either +ħ/2 or −ħ/2 due to it having a spin of 1/2, which gives a specific size of magnetic moment to the electron; the Bohr magneton. Electrons orbiting around the nucleus in a current loop create a magnetic field which depends on the Bohr magneton and magnetic quantum number. Therefore, the magnetic moments are related between angular and orbital momentum and affect each other. Angular momentum contributes twice as much to magnetic moments than orbital.

For terbium which is a rare-earth metal and has a high orbital angular momentum the magnetic moment is strong enough to affect the order above its bulk temperatures. It is said to have a high anisotropy on the surface, that is it is highly directed in one orientation. It remains ferromagnetic on its surface above its Curie temperature (219 K) while its bulk becomes antiferromagnetic and then at higher temperatures its surface remains antiferromagnetic above its bulk Néel Temperature (230 K) before becoming completely disordered and paramagnetic with increasing temperature. The anisotropy in the bulk is different from its surface anisotropy just above these phase changes as the magnetic moments will be ordered differently or ordered in paramagnetic materials.

=== Changing a material's Curie temperature ===
==== Composite materials ====
Composite materials, that is, materials composed from other materials with different properties, can change the Curie temperature. For example, a composite which has silver in it can create spaces for oxygen molecules in bonding which decreases the Curie temperature as the crystal lattice will not be as compact.

The alignment of magnetic moments in the composite material affects the Curie temperature. If the material's moments are parallel with each other, the Curie temperature will increase and if perpendicular the Curie temperature will decrease as either more or less thermal energy will be needed to destroy the alignments.

Preparing composite materials through different temperatures can result in different final compositions which will have different Curie temperatures. Doping a material can also affect its Curie temperature.

The density of nanocomposite materials changes the Curie temperature. Nanocomposites are compact structures on a nano-scale. The structure is built up of high and low bulk Curie temperatures, however will only have one mean-field Curie temperature. A higher density of lower bulk temperatures results in a lower mean-field Curie temperature, and a higher density of higher bulk temperature significantly increases the mean-field Curie temperature. In more than one dimension the Curie temperature begins to increase as the magnetic moments will need more thermal energy to overcome the ordered structure.

==== Particle size ====
The size of particles in a material's crystal lattice changes the Curie temperature. Due to the small size of particles (nanoparticles) the fluctuations of electron spins become more prominent, which results in the Curie temperature drastically decreasing when the size of particles decreases, as the fluctuations cause disorder. The size of a particle also affects the anisotropy causing alignment to become less stable and thus lead to disorder in magnetic moments.

The extreme of this is superparamagnetism which only occurs in small ferromagnetic particles. In this phenomenon, fluctuations are very influential causing magnetic moments to change direction randomly and thus create disorder.

The Curie temperature of nanoparticles is also affected by the crystal lattice structure: body-centred cubic (bcc), face-centred cubic (fcc), and a hexagonal structure (hcp) all have different Curie temperatures due to magnetic moments reacting to their neighbouring electron spins. fcc and hcp have tighter structures and as a results have higher Curie temperatures than bcc as the magnetic moments have stronger effects when closer together. This is known as the coordination number which is the number of nearest neighbouring particles in a structure. This indicates a lower coordination number at the surface of a material than the bulk which leads to the surface becoming less significant when the temperature is approaching the Curie temperature. In smaller systems the coordination number for the surface is more significant and the magnetic moments have a stronger effect on the system.

Although fluctuations in particles can be minuscule, they are heavily dependent on the structure of crystal lattices as they react with their nearest neighbouring particles. Fluctuations are also affected by the exchange interaction as parallel facing magnetic moments are favoured and therefore have less disturbance and disorder, therefore a tighter structure influences a stronger magnetism and therefore a higher Curie temperature.

==== Pressure ====
Pressure changes a material's Curie temperature. Increasing pressure on the crystal lattice decreases the volume of the system. Pressure directly affects the kinetic energy in particles as movement increases causing the vibrations to disrupt the order of magnetic moments. This is similar to temperature as it also increases the kinetic energy of particles and destroys the order of magnetic moments and magnetism.

Pressure also affects the density of states (DOS). Here the DOS decreases causing the number of electrons available to the system to decrease. This leads to the number of magnetic moments decreasing as they depend on electron spins. It would be expected because of this that the Curie temperature would decrease; however, it increases. This is the result of the exchange interaction. The exchange interaction favours the aligned parallel magnetic moments due to electrons being unable to occupy the same space in time and as this is increased due to the volume decreasing the Curie temperature increases with pressure. The Curie temperature is made up of a combination of dependencies on kinetic energy and the DOS.

The concentration of particles also affects the Curie temperature when pressure is being applied and can result in a decrease in Curie temperature when the concentration is above a certain percent.

==== Orbital ordering ====
Orbital ordering changes the Curie temperature of a material. Orbital ordering can be controlled through applied strains. This is a function that determines the wave of a single electron or paired electrons inside the material. Having control over the probability of where the electron will be allows the Curie temperature to be altered. For example, the delocalised electrons can be moved onto the same plane by applied strains within the crystal lattice.

The Curie temperature is seen to increase greatly due to electrons being packed together in the same plane, they are forced to align due to the exchange interaction and thus increases the strength of the magnetic moments which prevents thermal disorder at lower temperatures.

== In ferroelectric materials ==
In analogy to ferromagnetic and paramagnetic materials, the term Curie temperature (T_{C}) is also applied to the temperature at which a ferroelectric material transitions to being paraelectric. Hence, T_{C} is the temperature where ferroelectric materials lose their spontaneous polarisation as a first or second order phase change occurs. In case of a second order transition, the Curie Weiss temperature T_{0} which defines the maximum of the dielectric constant is equal to the Curie temperature. However, the Curie temperature can be 10 K higher than T_{0} in case of a first order transition.

Figure 4. (Below T_{0}) Ferroelectric polarisation P in an applied electric field E

Figure 5. (Above T_{0}) Dielectric polarisation P in an applied electric field E

Below T_{C}	Above T_{C}
Ferroelectric	↔ Dielectric (paraelectric)
Antiferroelectric	↔ Dielectric (paraelectric)
Ferrielectric	↔ Dielectric (paraelectric)
Helielectric	↔ Dielectric (paraelectric)

=== Ferroelectric and dielectric ===
Materials are only ferroelectric below their corresponding transition temperature T_{0}. Ferroelectric materials are all pyroelectric and therefore have a spontaneous electric polarisation as the structures are unsymmetrical.

Ferroelectric materials' polarization is subject to hysteresis (Figure 4); that is they are dependent on their past state as well as their current state. As an electric field is applied the dipoles are forced to align and polarisation is created, when the electric field is removed polarisation remains. The hysteresis loop depends on temperature and as a result as the temperature is increased and reaches T_{0} the two curves become one curve as shown in the dielectric polarisation (Figure 5).

=== Relative permittivity ===
A modified version of the Curie–Weiss law applies to the dielectric constant, also known as the relative permittivity:

$$\epsilon = \epsilon_0 + \frac{C}{T-T_\mathrm{0}}.$$

== Applications ==
A heat-induced ferromagnetic-paramagnetic transition is used in magneto-optical storage media for erasing and writing of new data. Famous examples include the Sony Minidisc format as well as the now-obsolete CD-MO format. Curie point electro-magnets have been proposed and tested for actuation mechanisms in passive safety systems of fast breeder reactors, where control rods are dropped into the reactor core if the actuation mechanism heats up beyond the material's Curie point. Other uses include temperature control in soldering irons and stabilizing the magnetic field of tachometer generators against temperature variation.

== See also ==
- Ferroelectricity – Property of materials which both possess and are affected by electric fields
- Curie's law – Relation of magnetization to applied magnetic field and temperature
- Hopkinson effect – Feature of ferromagnetic or ferrimagnetic materials
