= Ferrimagnetism =

Type of magnetic phenomenon

Ferrimagnetic ordering

Magnetic orders: comparison between ferro, antiferro and ferrimagnetism

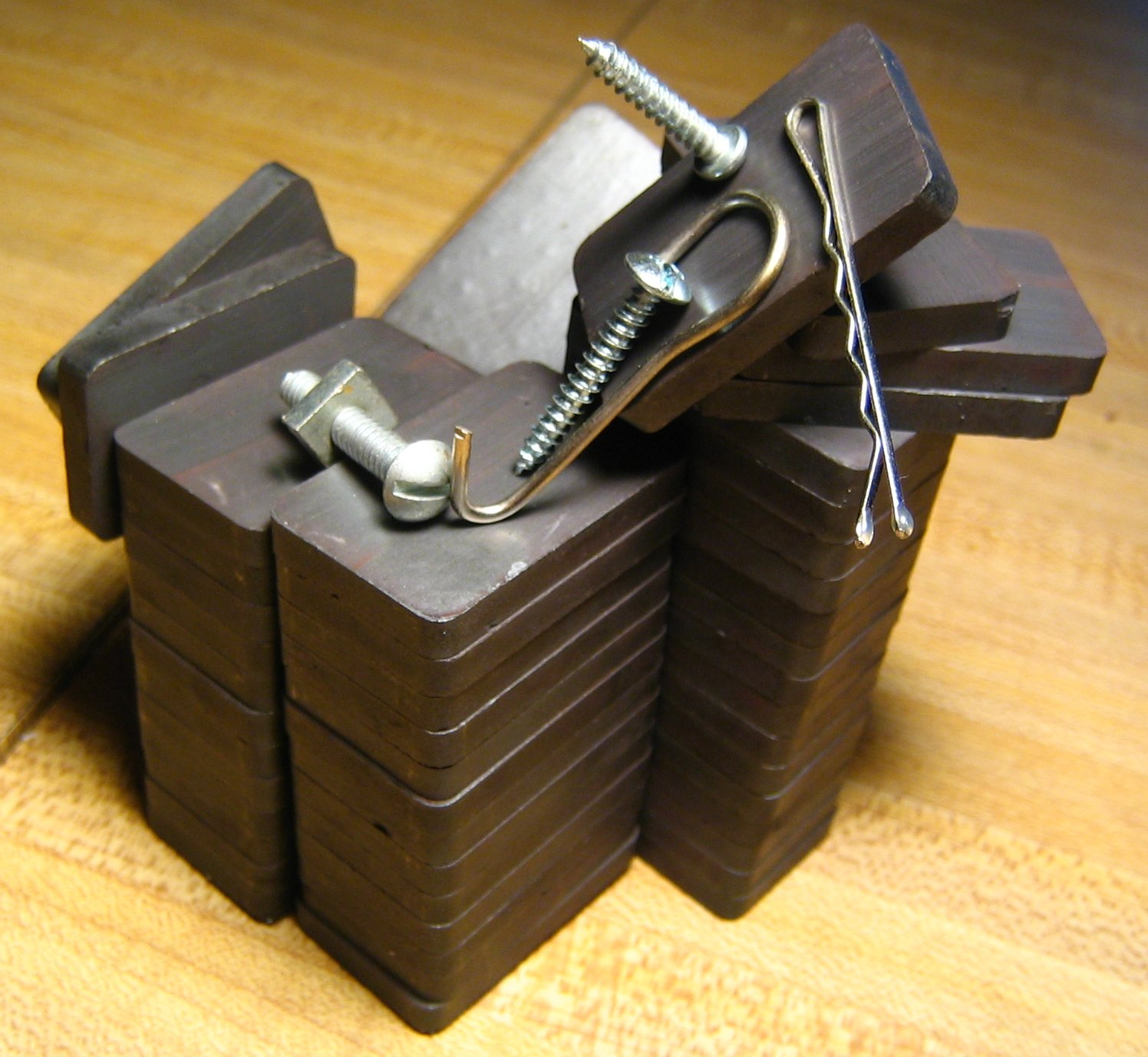
Ferrite magnets. Ferrite, a ceramic compound, is one of the most common examples of a ferrimagnetic material.

A ferrimagnetic material is a material that has populations of atoms with opposing magnetic moments, as in antiferromagnetism, but these moments are unequal in magnitude, so a spontaneous magnetization remains. This can, for example, occur when the populations consist of different atoms or ions (such as Fe^{2+} and Fe^{3+}). In addition, ferrimagnets can be compensated Néel-ordered magnets, i.e. with equal in magnitude and antialigned spins as in antiferromagnetism, but characterized by a lack of symmetry connecting their magnetic sublattices.

Like ferromagnetic substances, ferrimagnetic substances are attracted by magnets and can be magnetized to make permanent magnets. The oldest known magnetic substance, magnetite (Fe_{3}O_{4}), is ferrimagnetic, but was classified as a ferromagnet before Louis Néel discovered ferrimagnetism in 1948. Since the discovery, numerous uses have been found for ferrimagnetic materials, such as hard-drive platters and biomedical applications.

When the material is amorphous, it is sperimagnetic.

== History ==
Until the twentieth century, all naturally occurring magnetic substances were called ferromagnets. In 1936, Louis Néel published a paper proposing the existence of a new form of cooperative magnetism he called antiferromagnetism. While working with Mn_{2}Sb, French physicist Charles Guillaud discovered that the current theories on magnetism were not adequate to explain the behavior of the material, and made a model to explain the behavior. In 1948, Néel published a paper about a third type of cooperative magnetism, based on the assumptions in Guillaud's model. He called it ferrimagnetism. In 1970, Néel was awarded for his work in magnetism with the Nobel Prize in Physics.

== Physical origin ==
➀ Below the magnetization compensation point, ferrimagnetic material is magnetic. ➁ At the compensation point, the magnetic components cancel each other, and the total magnetic moment is zero. ➂ Above the Curie temperature, the material loses magnetism.

Ferrimagnetism has the same physical origins as ferromagnetism and antiferromagnetism. In ferrimagnetic materials the magnetization is also caused by a combination of dipole–dipole interactions and exchange interactions resulting from the Pauli exclusion principle. The main difference is that in ferrimagnetic materials there are different types of atoms in the material's unit cell. An example of this can be seen in the figure above. Here the atoms with a smaller magnetic moment point in the opposite direction of the larger moments. This arrangement is similar to that present in antiferromagnetic materials, but in ferrimagnetic materials the net moment is nonzero because the opposed moments differ in magnitude.

Ferrimagnets have a critical temperature above which they become paramagnetic just as ferromagnets do. At this temperature (called the Curie temperature) there is a second-order phase transition, and the system can no longer maintain a spontaneous magnetization. This is because at higher temperatures the thermal motion is strong enough that it exceeds the tendency of the dipoles to align.

== Derivation ==
There are various ways to describe ferrimagnets, the simplest of which is with mean-field theory. In mean-field theory the field acting on the atoms can be written as

$$\vec{H}=\vec{H}_0+\vec{H}_m$$,

where $\vec{H}_0$ is the applied magnetic field, and $\vec{H}_m$ is field caused by the interactions between the atoms. The following assumption then is $\vec{H}_m=\gamma\vec{M}$.

Here, $\vec{M}$ is the average magnetization of the lattice, and $\gamma$ is the molecular field coefficient. When $\vec{M}$ and $\gamma$ is allowed to be position- and orientation-dependent, it can then be written in the form

$$\vec{H}_i=\vec{H}_0+\sum_{k=1}^n\gamma_{ik}\vec{M}_k$$,

where $\vec{H}_i$ is the field acting on the i-th substructure, and $\gamma_{ik}$ is the molecular field coefficient between the i-th and k-th substructures. For a diatomic lattice, two types of sites can be designated, a and b. $N$ can be designated the number of magnetic ions per unit volume, $\lambda$ the fraction of the magnetic ions on the a sites, and $\mu=1-\lambda$ the fraction on the b sites. This then gives

$$\vec{H}_{aa} = \gamma_{aa}\vec{M}_a, \quad
\vec{H}_{ab} = \gamma_{ab}\vec{M}_b, \quad
\vec{H}_{ba} = \gamma_{ba}\vec{M}_a, \quad
\vec{H}_{bb} = \gamma_{bb}\vec{M}_b.$$

It can be shown that $\gamma_{ab}=\gamma_{ba}$ and that $\gamma_{aa}\neq\gamma_{bb}$, unless the structures are identical. $\gamma_{ab}>0$ favors a parallel alignment of $\vec{M}_a$ and $\vec{M}_b$, while $\gamma_{ab}<0$ favors an anti-parallel alignment. For ferrimagnets, $\gamma_{ab}<0$, so it will be convenient to take $\gamma_{ab}$ as a positive quantity and write the minus sign explicitly in front of it. For the total fields on a and b this then gives

$$\vec{H}_a=\vec{H}_0+\gamma_{aa}\vec{M}_a-\gamma_{ab}\vec{M}_b$$,
$$\vec{H}_b=\vec{H}_0+\gamma_{bb}\vec{M}_b-\gamma_{ab}\vec{M}_a$$.

Furthermore, the parameters $\alpha=\gamma_{aa}/\gamma_{ab}$ and $\beta=\gamma_{bb}/\gamma_{ab}$ will be introduced, which give the ratio between the strengths of the interactions. At last, the reduced magnetizations will be introduced

$$\vec{\sigma}_a=\vec{M}_a/\lambda Ng\mu_B S_a$$,
$$\vec{\sigma}_b=\vec{M}_b/\mu Ng\mu_BS_b$$

with $S_i$ the spin of the i-th element. This then gives for the fields:

$$\vec{H}_a=\vec{H}_0+Ng\mu_B S_a\gamma_{ab}(\lambda\alpha\vec{\sigma}_a-\mu\vec{\sigma}_b)$$,
$$\vec{H}_b=\vec{H}_0+Ng\mu_BS_b\gamma_{ab}(-\lambda\vec{\sigma}_a+\mu\beta\vec{\sigma}_b)$$

The solutions to these equations (omitted here) are then given by

$$\sigma_a=B_{S_a}(g\mu_bS_aH_a/k_\text{B}T)$$,
$$\sigma_b=B_{S_b}(g\mu_bS_bH_b/k_\text{B}T)$$.

where $B_J(x)$ is the Brillouin function. The simplest case to solve now is $S_a=S_b=1/2$. Since $B_{1/2}(x)=\tanh(x)$, this then gives the following pair of equations:

$$\lambda\sigma_a=\frac{\tau F(\lambda,\alpha,\beta)}{\alpha\beta-1}(\beta\tanh^{-1}\sigma_a+\tanh^{-1}\sigma_b)$$,
$$\mu\sigma_b=\frac{\tau F(\lambda,\alpha,\beta)}{\alpha\beta-1}(\tanh^{-1}\sigma_a+\alpha\tanh^{-1}\sigma_b)$$

with $\tau=T/T_\text{c}$ and $F(\lambda,\alpha,\beta)=\frac{1}{2}\left(\lambda\alpha+\mu\beta+\sqrt{(\lambda\alpha-\mu\beta)^2+4\lambda\mu}\right)$. These equations do not have a known analytical solution, so they must be solved numerically to find the temperature dependence of $\mu$.

== Effects of temperature ==
Unlike ferromagnetism, the magnetization curves of ferrimagnetism can take many different shapes depending on the strength of the interactions and the relative abundance of atoms. The most notable instances of this property are that the direction of magnetization can reverse while heating a ferrimagnetic material from absolute zero to its critical temperature, and that strength of magnetization can increase while heating a ferrimagnetic material to the critical temperature, both of which cannot occur for ferromagnetic materials. These temperature dependencies have also been experimentally observed in NiFe_{2/5}Cr_{8/5}O_{4} and Li_{1/2}Fe_{5/4}Ce_{5/4}O_{4}.

A temperature lower than the Curie temperature, but at which the opposing magnetic moments are equal (resulting in a net magnetic moment of zero) is called a magnetization compensation point. This compensation point is observed easily in garnets and rare-earth–transition-metal alloys (RE-TM). Furthermore, ferrimagnets may also have an angular momentum compensation point, at which the net angular momentum vanishes. This compensation point is crucial for achieving fast magnetization reversal in magnetic-memory devices.

== Effect of external fields ==
Theoretical model of magnetization m against magnetic field h. Starting at the origin, the upward curve is the initial magnetization curve. The downward curve after saturation, along with the lower return curve, form the main loop. The intercepts h_{c} and m_{rs} are the coercivity and saturation remanence.

When ferrimagnets are exposed to an external magnetic field, they display what is called magnetic hysteresis, where magnetic behavior depends on the history of the magnet. They also exhibit a saturation magnetization $M_\text{rs}$; this magnetization is reached when the external field is strong enough to make all the moments align in the same direction. When this point is reached, the magnetization cannot increase, as there are no more moments to align. When the external field is removed, the magnetization of the ferrimagnet does not disappear, but a nonzero magnetization remains. This effect is often used in applications of magnets. If an external field in the opposite direction is applied subsequently, the magnet will demagnetize further until it eventually reaches a magnetization of $-M_\text{rs}$. This behavior results in what is called a hysteresis loop.

== Properties and uses ==
Ferrimagnetic materials have high resistivity and have anisotropic properties. The anisotropy is actually induced by an external applied field. When this applied field aligns with the magnetic dipoles, it causes a net magnetic dipole moment and causes the magnetic dipoles to precess at a frequency controlled by the applied field, called Larmor or precession frequency. As a particular example, a microwave signal circularly polarized in the same direction as this precession strongly interacts with the magnetic dipole moments; when it is polarized in the opposite direction, the interaction is very low. When the interaction is strong, the microwave signal can pass through the material. This directional property is used in the construction of microwave devices like isolators, circulators, and gyrators. Ferrimagnetic materials are also used to produce optical isolators and circulators. Ferrimagnetic minerals in various rock types are used to study ancient geomagnetic properties of Earth and other planets. That field of study is known as paleomagnetism. In addition, it has been shown that ferrimagnets such as magnetite can be used for thermal energy storage.

== Examples ==
The oldest known magnetic material, magnetite, is a ferrimagnetic substance. The tetrahedral and octahedral sites of its crystal structure exhibit opposite spin. Other known ferrimagnetic materials include yttrium iron garnet (YIG); cubic ferrites composed of iron oxides with other elements such as aluminum, cobalt, nickel, manganese, and zinc; and hexagonal or spinel type ferrites, including rhenium ferrite, ReFe_{2}O_{4}, PbFe_{12}O_{19} and BaFe_{12}O_{19} and pyrrhotite, Fe_{1−x}S.

Ferrimagnetism can also occur in single-molecule magnets. A classic example is a dodecanuclear manganese molecule with an effective spin S = 10 derived from antiferromagnetic interaction on Mn(IV) metal centers with Mn(III) and Mn(II) metal centers.

== See also ==
- Anisotropy energy
- Orbital magnetization – Quantized magnetization of charged particles
