= Hendrika Johanna van Leeuwen =

Dutch theoretical physicist (1887–1974)

Hendrika van Leeuwen
- Van Leeuwen, c. 1920
- Born: 3 July 1887; The Hague, South Holland, Netherlands
- Died: 26 February 1974 (aged 86); Delft, South Holland, Netherlands
- Education: Leiden University (PhD)
- Known for: Bohr–Van Leeuwen theorem (1919)
- Relatives: Gunnar Nordström (brother-in-law)
- Scientific career
- Fields: Magnetism
- Workplaces: Technische Hogeschool Delft (1920–52)
- Thesis: Vraagstukken uit de electronentheorie van het magnetisme (1919)
- Doctoral advisor: Hendrik Lorentz

Hendrika Johanna van Leeuwen (July 3, 1887 – February 26, 1974) was a Dutch theoretical physicist known for her early contributions to the theory of magnetism. She demonstrated that magnetism in matter can only be explained using quantum mechanics. She was one of the first women to study physics at a university level in the Netherlands.

== Biography ==
Hendrika Johanna van Leeuwen was born on 3 July 1887 in The Hague, Netherlands, the daughter of Pieter Eliza van Leeuwen and Maria Wilhelmina Schepman. She and her sister enrolled at The Hague Boys' School when it began accepting female students in 1901, although it still required applying for a special ministerial permit. She was also allowed to take the examination in Greek and Latin, a prerequisite for university studies.

Van Leeuwen studied under Hendrik Lorentz at Leiden University, beginning her doctoral work in 1914 and receiving her Ph.D. in 1919. She was not Lorentz's first female doctoral student; three other women had earned their doctorates with him earlier. Her thesis explained why magnetism in solids is fundamentally a quantum mechanical effect. Her starting point was Lorentz's classical electron theory and his observation that classical free-moving electrons in a metal do not generate a net magnetic moment. She examined a range of other systems and concluded that any classical system in a magnetic field and in thermal equilibrium has no magnetic moment. In other words, classical physics cannot produce any kind of magnetism.

Niels Bohr independently discovered the principle in his 1911 doctoral thesis, but his work was not widely known because it was written in Danish and he was not yet a prominent figure. The result became well known after van Leeuwen published an article based on her doctoral thesis in 1921. In his 1932 book, John Van Vleck named the discovery "Miss van Leeuwen's theorem", highlighting her more comprehensive analysis compared to Bohr's. By 1977, the credit had shifted; in his Nobel lecture, Van Vleck emphasized Bohr's contribution, and van Leeuwen's name was relegated to a footnote. The discovery is now usually referred to as the Bohr–Van Leeuwen theorem, acknowledging both contributions.

Van Leeuwen continued to investigate magnetic materials at Technische Hogeschool Delft (now Delft University of Technology). In September 1920, she was appointed an assistant, a role she held for nearly 30 years. In this position, she supervised laboratory courses in electrical engineering. Her teaching was appreciated by her students, but it left her with little time for research. In April 1947, at the age of 59, she was promoted to lector in de theoretische en toegepaste natuurkunde (reader in theoretical and applied physics) which entitled her to teach her own courses. This appointment was considered long overdue by her contemporaries, and came too late for her to build a career in research. She retired from Delft in 1952.

Van Leeuwen died on 26 February 1974 in Delft at the age of 86.

== Personal life ==
Van Leeuwen was the sister-in-law of Gunnar Nordström, known as the "Einstein of Finland", who studied in Leiden with Paul Ehrenfest, the successor of Lorentz. Her sister Cornelia (Nel) also started a PhD in Leiden, under Willem Hendrik Keesom, but stopped when she married Nordström and moved with him to Helsinki.

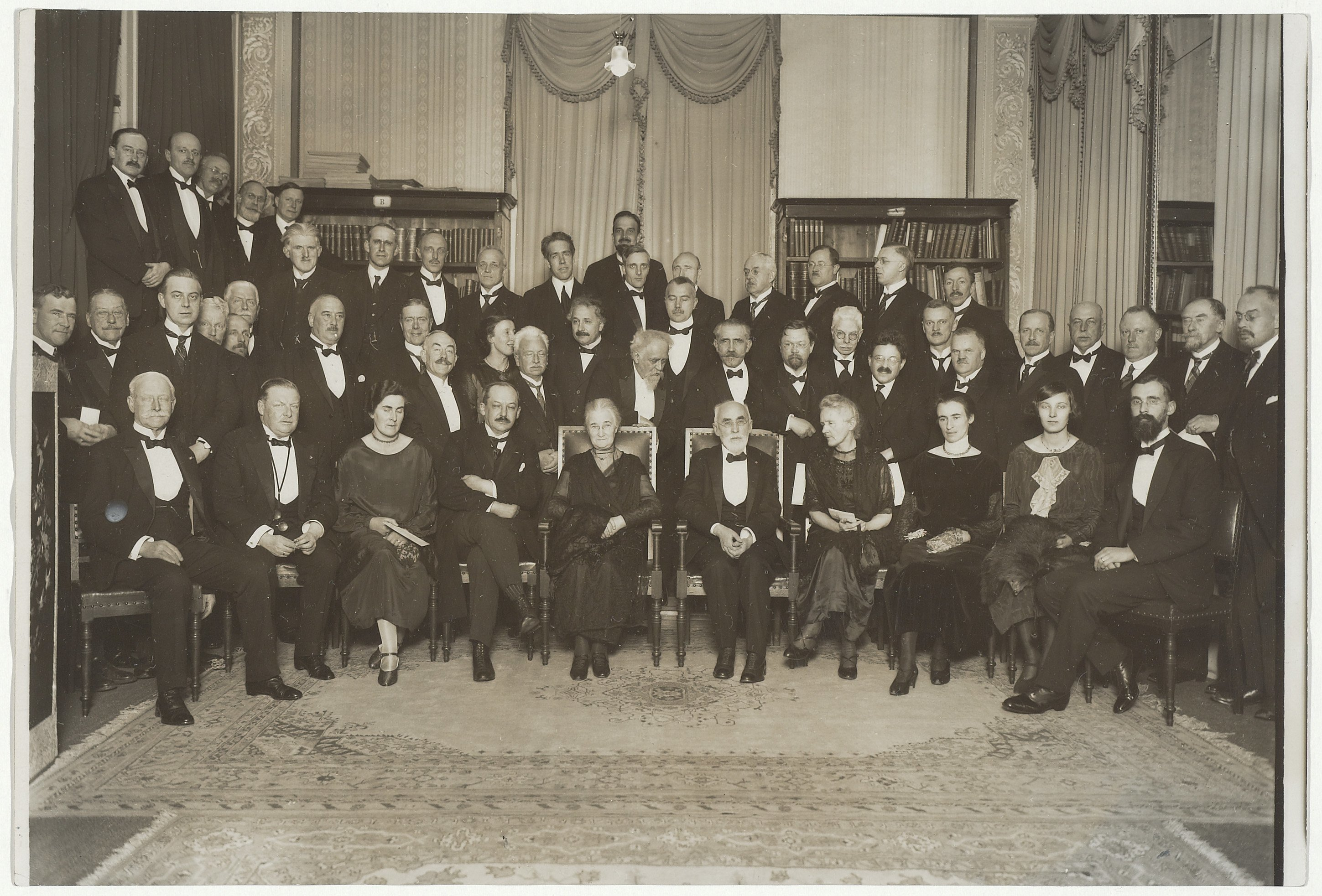
Van Leeuwen attended the golden anniversary of the doctorate of Hendrik Lorentz. In this photograph of the dinner guests, Van Leeuwen is standing to the left of Albert Einstein, below Niels Bohr.

Van Leeuwen remained close with her doctoral advisor Lorentz until his death in 1928. She attended the celebration of the golden anniversary of the doctorate of Lorentz, on 11 December 1925, and on that occasion reported on the role of Lorentz as scientist and teacher.

== Selected works ==
- van Leeuwen, H.-J. (1921). "Problèmes de la théorie électronique du magnétisme". Journal de Physique et le Radium. 2 (12): 361–377. doi:10.1051/jphysrad:01921002012036100.
