= Bohr–Van Leeuwen theorem =

Theorem on magnetism

The Bohr–Van Leeuwen theorem states that when statistical mechanics and classical mechanics are applied consistently, the thermal average of the magnetization is always zero. This makes magnetism in solids solely a quantum mechanical effect and means that classical physics cannot account for paramagnetism, diamagnetism and ferromagnetism. The inability of classical physics to explain triboelectricity also stems from the Bohr–Van Leeuwen theorem.

== History ==
What is today known as the Bohr–Van Leeuwen theorem was discovered by Niels Bohr in 1911 in his doctoral dissertation and was later rediscovered by Hendrika Johanna van Leeuwen in her doctoral thesis in 1919. In 1932, J. H. Van Vleck formalized and expanded upon Bohr's initial theorem in a book he wrote on electric and magnetic susceptibilities. He called the result "Miss van Leeuwen's theorem", although he also acknowledged that Bohr had obtained many of Van Leeuwen's results before her.

The significance of this discovery is that classical physics does not allow for such things as paramagnetism, diamagnetism and ferromagnetism and thus quantum physics is needed to explain the magnetic events. This result, "perhaps the most deflationary publication of all time," may have contributed to Bohr's development of a quasi-classical theory of the hydrogen atom in 1913.

== Case of classical paramagnetism ==
The Langevin function is often seen as the classical theory of paramagnetism, while the Brillouin function is the quantum theory of paramagnetism. Langevin published the theory of paramagnetism in 1905 before the adoption of quantum physics, meaning that Langevin only used concepts of classical physics.

Still, Niels Bohr showed in his thesis that classical statistical mechanics cannot be used to explain paramagnetism, and that quantum theory had to be used (in what would become the Bohr–Van Leeuwen theorem). This would later lead to an explanation of magnetization based on quantum theory, such as the Brillouin function that uses the Bohr magneton ($\mu_B$), and considers the energy of a system to not be a continuous variable.

There is a difference in the approaches of Langevin and Bohr since Langevin assumes a magnetic polarization $\mu$ as the basis for the derivation while Bohr started the derivation from motions of electrons and a model of an atom (Langevin was still assuming a quantified, fixed magnetic dipole). This is expressed by J. H. Van Vleck: "When Langevin assumed that the magnetic moment of the atom or molecule had a fixed value $\mu$, he was quantizing the system without realizing it". This makes the Langevin function to be in the borderland between classical statistical mechanics and quantum theory (as either semi-classical or semi-quantum).

== Proof ==
=== An intuitive proof ===
The Bohr–Van Leeuwen theorem applies to an isolated system that cannot rotate. If the isolated system is allowed to rotate in response to an externally applied magnetic field, then this theorem does not apply. If, in addition, there is only one state of thermal equilibrium in a given temperature and field, and the system is allowed time to return to equilibrium after a field is applied, then there will be no magnetization.

The probability that the system will be in a given state of motion is predicted by Maxwell–Boltzmann statistics to be proportional to $\exp(-U/k_\text{B} T)$, where $U$ is the energy of the system, $k_\text{B}$ is the Boltzmann constant, and $T$ is the absolute temperature. This energy is equal to the sum of the kinetic energy ($m v^2/2$ for a particle with mass $m$ and speed $v$) and the potential energy.

The magnetic field does not contribute to the potential energy. The Lorentz force on a particle with charge $q$ and velocity $\mathbf{v}$ is

$$\mathbf{F} = q \left(\mathbf{E} + \mathbf{v}\times\mathbf{B}\right),$$

where $\mathbf{E}$ is the electric field and $\mathbf{B}$ is the magnetic flux density. The rate of work done is $\mathbf{F}\cdot\mathbf{v} = q\mathbf{E}\cdot\mathbf{v}$ and does not depend on $\mathbf{B}$. Therefore, the energy does not depend on the magnetic field, so the distribution of motions does not depend on the magnetic field.

In zero field, there will be no net motion of charged particles because the system is not able to rotate. There will therefore be an average magnetic moment of zero. Since the distribution of motions does not depend on the magnetic field, the moment in thermal equilibrium remains zero in any magnetic field.

=== A more formal proof ===
So as to lower the complexity of the proof, a system with $N$ electrons will be used.

This is appropriate, since most of the magnetism in a solid is carried by electrons, and the proof is easily generalized to more than one type of charged particle.

Each electron has a negative charge $e$ and mass $m_\text{e}$.

If its position is $\mathbf{r}$ and velocity is $\mathbf{v}$, it produces a current $\mathbf{j} = e\mathbf{v}$ and a magnetic moment

$$\mathbf{\mu} = \frac{1}{2c}\mathbf{r}\times\mathbf{j} = \frac{e}{2c}\mathbf{r}\times\mathbf{v}.$$

The above equation shows that the magnetic moment is a linear function of the velocity coordinates, so the total magnetic moment in a given direction must be a linear function of the form

$$\mu = \sum_{i=1}^N\mathbf{a}_i\cdot\dot{\mathbf{r}}_i,$$

where the dot represents a time derivative and $\mathbf{a}_i$ are vector coefficients depending on the position coordinates $\{\mathbf{r}_i,i=1\ldots N\}$.

Maxwell–Boltzmann statistics gives the probability that the nth particle has momentum $\mathbf{p}_n$ and coordinate $\mathbf{r}_n$ as

$$dP \propto \exp{\left[-\frac{\mathcal{H}(\mathbf{p}_1,\ldots,\mathbf{p}_N;\mathbf{r}_1,\ldots,\mathbf{r}_N)}{k_\text{B}T}\right]}d\mathbf{p}_1,\ldots,d\mathbf{p}_Nd\mathbf{r}_1,\ldots,d\mathbf{r}_N,$$

where $\mathcal{H}$ is the Hamiltonian, the total energy of the system.

The thermal average of any function $f(\mathbf{p}_1,\ldots,\mathbf{p}_N;\mathbf{r}_1,\ldots,\mathbf{r}_N)$ of these generalized coordinates is then

$$\langle f\rangle =\frac{\int f dP}{\int dP}.$$

In the presence of a magnetic field,

$$\mathcal{H} = \frac{1}{2m_\text{e}}\sum_{i=1}^N \left(\mathbf{p}_i - \frac{e}{c}\mathbf{A}_i \right)^2 + e\phi(\mathbf{q}),$$

where $\mathbf{A}_i$ is the magnetic vector potential and $\phi(\mathbf{q})$ is the electric scalar potential. For each particle the components of the momentum $\mathbf{p}_i$ and position $\mathbf{r}_i$ are related by the equations of Hamiltonian mechanics:

$$\begin{align}
\dot{\mathbf{p}}_i &= -\partial \mathcal{H} / \partial \mathbf{r}_i\\
\dot{\mathbf{r}}_i &= \partial \mathcal{H} / \partial \mathbf{p}_i.
\end{align}$$

Therefore,

$$\dot{\mathbf{r}}_i \propto \mathbf{p}_i - \frac{e}{c}\mathbf{A}_i,$$

so the moment $\mu$ is a linear function of the momenta $\mathbf{p}_i$.

The thermally averaged moment,

$$\langle \mu \rangle = \frac{\int \mu dP}{\int dP},$$

is the sum of terms proportional to integrals of the form

$$\int_{-\infty}^\infty (\mathbf{p}_i - \frac{e}{c}\mathbf{A}_i) dP,$$

where $p$ represents one of the momentum coordinates.

The integrand is an odd function of $p$, so it vanishes.

Therefore, $\langle\mu\rangle=0$.

== Applications ==
The Bohr–Van Leeuwen theorem is useful in several applications including plasma physics: "All these references base their discussion of the Bohr–Van Leeuwen theorem on Niels Bohr's physical model, in which perfectly reflecting walls are necessary to provide the currents that cancel the net contribution from the interior of an element of plasma, and result in zero net diamagnetism for the plasma element."

Diamagnetism of a purely classical nature occurs in plasmas but is a consequence of thermal disequilibrium, such as a gradient in plasma density. Electromechanics and electrical engineering also see practical benefit from the Bohr–Van Leeuwen theorem.
