= Spontaneous magnetization =

Sudden appearance of magnetic order in cold substances

Spontaneous magnetization is the appearance of an ordered spin state (magnetization) at zero applied magnetic field in a ferromagnetic or ferrimagnetic material below a critical point called the Curie temperature or T_{C}.

== Overview ==
Heated to temperatures above T_{C}, ferromagnetic materials become paramagnetic and their magnetic behavior is dominated by spin waves or magnons, which are boson collective excitations with energies in the meV range. The magnetization that occurs below T_{C} is an example of the "spontaneous" breaking of a global symmetry, a phenomenon that is described by Goldstone's theorem. The term "symmetry breaking" refers to the choice of a magnetization direction by the spins, which have spherical symmetry above T_{C}, but a preferred axis (the magnetization direction) below T_{C}.

== Temperature dependence ==
To a first order approximation, the temperature dependence of spontaneous magnetization at low temperatures is given by the Bloch T^{3/2} law (by Felix Bloch):

$$M(T) = M(0) \left[1-\left(\frac{T}{T_{\mathrm{C}}} \right)^{3/2} \right],$$

where M(0) is the spontaneous magnetization at absolute zero. The decrease in spontaneous magnetization at higher temperatures is caused by the increasing excitation of spin waves. In a particle description, the spin waves correspond to magnons, which are the massless Goldstone bosons corresponding to the broken symmetry. This is exactly true for an isotropic magnet.

Magnetic anisotropy, that is the existence of an easy direction along which the moments align spontaneously in the crystal, corresponds however to "massive" magnons. This is a way of saying that they cost a minimum amount of energy to excite, hence they are very unlikely to be excited as $T\rightarrow 0$. Hence the magnetization of an anisotropic magnet is harder to destroy at low temperature and the temperature dependence of the magnetization deviates accordingly from the Bloch T^{3/2} law. All real magnets are anisotropic to some extent.

Near the Curie temperature,

$$M(T) \propto \left(T_{\mathrm{C}}-T\right)^\beta,$$

where β is a critical exponent that depends on the universality class of the magnetic interaction. Experimentally the exponent is 0.34 for iron and 0.51 for nickel.

An empirical interpolation of the two regimes is given by

$$\frac {M(T)}{M(0)} = \left (1-(T/T_{\mathrm{C}}\right)^{\alpha})^{\beta},$$

it is easy to check two limits of this interpolation that follow laws similar to the Bloch law, for $T \rightarrow 0$, and the critical behavior, for $T \rightarrow T_{\mathrm{C}}$, respectively.

== See also ==
- Magnetization
- Bloch T^{5} law

== Notes and references ==
- Ashcroft, Neil W.; Mermin, N. David (1976). Solid State Physics. Holt, Rinehart and Winston. ISBN 0-03-083993-9.
- Chikazumi, Sōshin (1997). Physics of Ferromagnetism. Clarendon Press. ISBN 0-19-851776-9.
