= Paramagnetism =

Weak, attractive magnetism possessed by most elements and some compounds

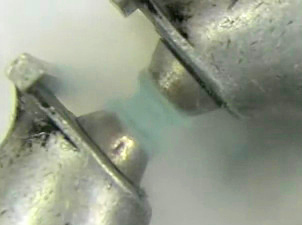
Liquid oxygen (blue) can be suspended between the poles of a strong magnet as a result of its paramagnetism.

Paramagnetism is a form of magnetism whereby some materials are weakly attracted by an externally applied magnetic field, and form internal, induced magnetic fields in the direction of the applied magnetic field. In contrast with this behavior, diamagnetic materials are repelled by magnetic fields and form induced magnetic fields in the direction opposite to that of the applied magnetic field. Paramagnetic materials include most chemical elements and some compounds; they have a relative magnetic permeability slightly greater than 1 (i.e., a small positive magnetic susceptibility) and hence are attracted to magnetic fields. The magnetic moment induced by the applied field is linear in the field strength and rather weak. It typically requires a sensitive analytical balance to detect the effect and modern measurements on paramagnetic materials are often conducted with a SQUID magnetometer.

Paramagnetism is due to the presence of unpaired electrons in the material, so most atoms with incompletely filled atomic orbitals are paramagnetic, although exceptions such as copper exist. Due to their spin, unpaired electrons have a magnetic dipole moment and act like tiny magnets. An external magnetic field causes the electrons' spins to align parallel to the field, causing a net attraction. Paramagnetic materials include aluminium, oxygen, titanium, and iron oxide (FeO). Therefore, a simple rule of thumb is used in chemistry to determine whether a particle (atom, ion, or molecule) is paramagnetic or diamagnetic: if all electrons in the particle are paired, then the substance made of this particle is diamagnetic; if it has unpaired electrons, then the substance is paramagnetic.

Unlike ferromagnets, paramagnets do not retain any magnetization in the absence of an externally applied magnetic field because thermal motion randomizes the spin orientations. Some paramagnetic materials retain spin disorder even at absolute zero, meaning they are paramagnetic in the ground state, i.e. in the absence of thermal motion. Thus, the total magnetization drops to zero when the applied field is removed. Even in the presence of the field there is only a small induced magnetization because only a small fraction of the spins will be oriented by the field. This fraction is proportional to the field strength and this explains the linear dependency. The attraction experienced by ferromagnetic materials is non-linear and much stronger, so that it is easily observed, for instance, in the attraction between a refrigerator magnet and the iron of the refrigerator itself.

== Relation to electron spins ==
Paramagnetism, ferromagnetism and spin waves

Constituent atoms or molecules of paramagnetic materials have permanent magnetic moments (dipoles), even in the absence of an applied field. The permanent moment generally is due to the spin of unpaired electrons in atomic or molecular electron orbitals (see Magnetic moment). In pure paramagnetism, the dipoles do not interact with one another and are randomly oriented in the absence of an external field due to thermal agitation, resulting in zero net magnetic moment. When a magnetic field is applied, the dipoles will tend to align with the applied field, resulting in a net magnetic moment in the direction of the applied field. In the classical description, this alignment can be understood to occur due to a torque being provided on the magnetic moments by an applied field, which tries to align the dipoles parallel to the applied field. However, the true origins of the alignment can only be understood via the quantum-mechanical properties of spin and angular momentum.

If there is sufficient energy exchange between neighbouring dipoles, they will interact, and may spontaneously align or anti-align and form magnetic domains, resulting in ferromagnetism (permanent magnets) or antiferromagnetism, respectively. Paramagnetic behavior can also be observed in ferromagnetic materials that are above their Curie temperature, and in antiferromagnets above their Néel temperature. At these temperatures, the available thermal energy simply overcomes the interaction energy between the spins.

In general, paramagnetic effects are quite small: the magnetic susceptibility is of the order of 10^{−3} to 10^{−5} for most paramagnets, but may be as high as 10^{−1} for synthetic paramagnets such as ferrofluids.

=== Delocalization ===
Selected Pauli-paramagnetic metals
Material	Magnetic susceptibility $\chi_v$ (SI definition) [10^{−5}]
Platinum	26
Tungsten	6.8
Caesium	5.1
Aluminium	2.2
Lithium	1.4
Magnesium	1.2
Sodium	0.72

In conductive materials, the electrons are delocalized, that is, they travel through the solid more or less as free electrons. Conductivity can be understood in a band structure picture as arising from the incomplete filling of energy bands. In an ordinary nonmagnetic conductor the conduction band is identical for both spin-up and spin-down electrons. When a magnetic field is applied, the conduction band splits apart into a spin-up and a spin-down band due to the difference in magnetic potential energy for spin-up and spin-down electrons. Since the Fermi level must be identical for both bands, this means that there will be a small surplus of the type of spin in the band that moved downwards. This effect is a weak form of paramagnetism known as Pauli paramagnetism.

The effect always competes with a diamagnetic response of opposite sign due to all the core electrons of the atoms. Stronger forms of magnetism usually require localized rather than itinerant electrons. However, in some cases a band structure can result in which there are two delocalized sub-bands with states of opposite spins that have different energies. If one subband is preferentially filled over the other, one can have itinerant ferromagnetic order. This situation usually only occurs in relatively narrow (d-)bands, which are poorly delocalized.

==== s and p electrons ====
Generally, strong delocalization in a solid due to large overlap with neighboring wave functions means that there will be a large Fermi velocity; this means that the number of electrons in a band is less sensitive to shifts in that band's energy, implying a weak magnetism. This is why s- and p-type metals are typically either Pauli-paramagnetic or as in the case of gold even diamagnetic. In the latter case the diamagnetic contribution from the closed shell inner electrons simply wins over the weak paramagnetic term of the almost free electrons.

==== d and f electrons ====
Stronger magnetic effects are typically only observed when d or f electrons are involved. Particularly the latter are usually strongly localized. Moreover, the size of the magnetic moment on a lanthanide atom can be quite large as it can carry up to 7 unpaired electrons in the case of gadolinium(III) (hence its use in MRI). The high magnetic moments associated with lanthanides is one reason why superstrong magnets are typically based on elements like neodymium or samarium.

==== Molecular localization ====
The above picture is a generalization as it pertains to materials with an extended lattice rather than a molecular structure. Molecular structure can also lead to localization of electrons. Although there are usually energetic reasons why a molecular structure results such that it does not exhibit partly filled orbitals (i.e. unpaired spins), some non-closed shell moieties do occur in nature. Molecular oxygen is a good example. Even in the frozen solid it contains di-radical molecules resulting in paramagnetic behavior. The unpaired spins reside in orbitals derived from oxygen p wave functions, but the overlap is limited to the one neighbor in the O_{2} molecules. The distances to other oxygen atoms in the lattice remain too large to lead to delocalization and the magnetic moments remain unpaired.

== Theory ==
The Bohr–Van Leeuwen theorem proves that there cannot be any diamagnetism or paramagnetism in a purely classical system. The paramagnetic response has then two possible quantum origins, either coming from permanent magnetic moments of the ions or from the spatial motion of the conduction electrons inside the material. Both descriptions are given below.

=== Curie's law ===
For low levels of magnetization, the magnetization of paramagnets follows what is known as Curie's law, at least approximately. This law indicates that the susceptibility, $\chi$, of paramagnetic materials is inversely proportional to their temperature, i.e. that materials become more magnetic at lower temperatures. The mathematical expression is:
$$\mathbf{M} = \chi\mathbf{H} = \frac{C}{T}\mathbf{H}$$
where:

- $\mathbf M$ is the resulting magnetization, measured in amperes/meter (A/m),
- $\chi$ is the volume magnetic susceptibility (dimensionless),
- $H$ is the auxiliary magnetic field (A/m),
- $T$ is absolute temperature, measured in kelvins (K),
- $C$ is a material-specific Curie constant (K).

Curie's law is valid under the commonly encountered conditions of low magnetization (μ_{B}H ≲ k_{B}T), but does not apply in the high-field/low-temperature regime where saturation of magnetization occurs (μ_{B}H ≳ k_{B}T) and magnetic dipoles are all aligned with the applied field. When the dipoles are aligned, increasing the external field will not increase the total magnetization since there can be no further alignment.

For a paramagnetic ion with noninteracting magnetic moments with angular momentum J, the Curie constant is related to the individual ions' magnetic moments,
$$C=\frac{n}{3k_\mathrm{B}}\mu_{\mathrm{eff}}^2 \text{ where } \mu_{\mathrm{eff}} = g_J \mu_\mathrm{B} \sqrt{J(J+1)}.$$
where n is the number of atoms per unit volume. The parameter μ_{eff} is interpreted as the effective magnetic moment per paramagnetic ion. If one uses a classical treatment with molecular magnetic moments represented as discrete magnetic dipoles, μ, a Curie Law expression of the same form will emerge with μ appearing in place of μ_{eff}.

Derivation

Curie's Law can be derived by considering a substance with noninteracting magnetic moments with angular momentum J. If orbital contributions to the magnetic moment are negligible (a common case), then in what follows J = S. If we apply a magnetic field along what we choose to call the z-axis, the energy levels of each paramagnetic center will experience Zeeman splitting of its energy levels, each with a z-component labeled by M_{J} (or just M_{S} for the spin-only magnetic case). Applying semiclassical Boltzmann statistics, the magnetization of such a substance is
$$n\bar{m} = \frac{n\sum\limits_{M_{J} = -J}^{J}{\mu_{M_{J}}e^{{-E_{M_{J}}}/{k_{\mathrm{B}}T}\;}}}{\sum\limits_{M_{J} = -J}^{J}{e^{{-E_{M_{J}}}/{k_{\mathrm{B}}T}\;}}} = \frac{n\sum\limits_{M_{J} = -J}^{J}{M_{J}g_{J}\mu_{\mathrm{B}}e^{{M_{J}g_{J}\mu_{\mathrm{B}}H}/{k_{\mathrm{B}}T}\;}}}{\sum\limits_{M_{J} = -J}^{J}{e^{{M_{J}g_{J}\mu_{\mathrm{B}}H}/{k_{\mathrm{B}}T}\;}}}.$$

Where $\mu_{M_J}$ is the z-component of the magnetic moment for each Zeeman level, so $\mu _{M_J} = M_J g_J\mu_\mathrm{B} - \mu_\mathrm{B}$ is called the Bohr magneton and g_{J} is the Landé g-factor, which reduces to the free-electron g-factor, g_{S} when J = S. (in this treatment, we assume that the x- and y-components of the magnetization, averaged over all molecules, cancel out because the field applied along the z-axis leave them randomly oriented.) The energy of each Zeeman level is $E_{M_J} = -M_J g_J \mu_\mathrm{B} H$. For temperatures over a few K, $M_J g_J \mu_\mathrm{B}H/k_\mathrm{B} T \ll 1$, and we can apply the approximation $e^{M_J g_J \mu_\mathrm{B} H /k_\mathrm{B} T\;} \simeq 1 + M_J g_J \mu_\mathrm{B} H/k_\mathrm{B} T\;$:
$$\bar{m}=\frac{\sum\limits_{M_J=-J}^J {M_J g_J \mu_\mathrm{B} e^{M_J g_J \mu_\mathrm{B} H/k_\mathrm{B} T\;}}}{\sum\limits_{M_J=-J}^J e^{M_Jg_J\mu_\mathrm{B} H/k_\mathrm{B} T\;}}\simeq g_J\mu_\mathrm{B} \frac{\sum\limits_{M_J=-J}^J M_J \left( 1+M_J g_J\mu_\mathrm{B} H/k_\mathrm{B} T\; \right)}{\sum\limits_{M_J=-J}^J \left( 1+M_J g_J \mu_\mathrm{B} H/k_\mathrm{B} T \; \right)}=\frac{g_J^2 \mu_\mathrm{B}^2 H}{k_\mathrm{B} T} \frac{\sum\limits_{-J}^J M_J^2}{\sum\limits_{M_J=-J}^J{(1)}},$$
which yields:
$$\bar{m}=\frac{g_J^2 \mu_\mathrm{B}^2 H}{3k_\mathrm{B} T} J(J+1).$$
The bulk magnetization is then $M = n\bar{m} = \frac{n}{3k_\mathrm{B}T} \left[ g_J^2 J(J+1) \mu_\mathrm{B}^2 \right]H,$ and the susceptibility is given by
$$\chi=\frac{\partial M_{\rm m}}{\partial H} = \frac{n}{3k_{\rm B} T} \mu_{\mathrm{eff}}^2 \text{  ;    and     } \mu_{\mathrm{eff}} = g_J \sqrt{J(J+1)} \mu_{\mathrm B}.$$

When orbital angular momentum contributions to the magnetic moment are small, as occurs for most organic radicals or for octahedral transition metal complexes with d^{3} or high-spin d^{5} configurations, the effective magnetic moment takes the form ( with g-factor g_{e} = 2.0023... ≈ 2),
$$\mu_{\mathrm{eff}}\simeq 2\sqrt{S(S+1)} \mu_\mathrm{B} =\sqrt{N_{\rm u}(N_{\rm u}+2)} \mu_\mathrm{B},$$
where N_{u} is the number of unpaired electrons. In other transition metal complexes this yields a useful, if somewhat cruder, estimate.

When Curie constant is null, second order effects that couple the ground state with the excited states can also lead to a paramagnetic susceptibility independent of the temperature, known as Van Vleck susceptibility.

=== Pauli paramagnetism ===
For some alkali metals and noble metals, conduction electrons are weakly interacting and delocalized in space forming a Fermi gas. For these materials one contribution to the magnetic response comes from the interaction between the electron spins and the magnetic field known as Pauli paramagnetism. For a small magnetic field $\mathbf{H}$, the additional energy per electron from the interaction between an electron spin and the magnetic field is given by:

$$\Delta E= -\mu_0\mathbf{H}\cdot\boldsymbol{\mu}_\text{e}=- \mu_0\mathbf{H}\cdot\left(-g_\text{e}\frac{\mu_\mathrm{B}}{\hbar}\mathbf{S}\right)=\pm \mu_0 \mu_\mathrm{B} H,$$

where $\mu_0$ is the vacuum permeability, $\boldsymbol{\mu}_\text{e}$ is the electron magnetic moment, $\mu_{\rm B}$ is the Bohr magneton, $\hbar$ is the reduced Planck constant, and the g-factor cancels with the spin $\mathbf{S}=\pm\hbar/2$. The $\pm$ sign indicates that the energy state is raised (lowered) when the electron spin component in the direction of $\mathbf{H}$ is parallel (antiparallel) to the magnetic field.

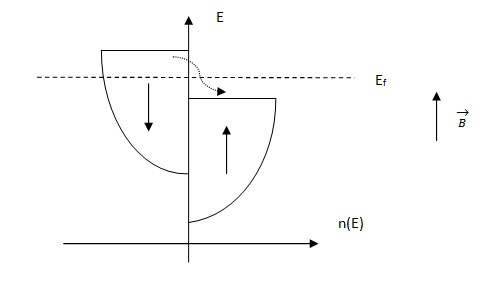
In a metal, the application of an external magnetic field increases the density of electrons with spins antiparallel with the field and lowers the density of the electrons with opposite spin. Note: The arrows in this picture indicate magnetic moment direction, not electron spin direction. The direction of the magnetic moment is opposite of that of the spin since electrons carry a negative charge.

For low temperatures with respect to the Fermi temperature $T_{\rm F}$ (around 10^{4} K for metals), the number density of electrons $n_{\uparrow}$ ($n_{\downarrow}$) pointing parallel (antiparallel) to the magnetic field can be written as:

$$n_{\uparrow}\approx\frac{n_\text{e}}{2}-\frac{\mu_0\mu_\mathrm{B}}{2}g(E_\mathrm{F})H\quad;\quad \left(n_{\downarrow}\approx\frac{n_\text{e}}{2}+\frac{\mu_0\mu_\mathrm{B}}{2}g(E_\mathrm{F})H\right),$$

with $n_\text{e}$ the total free-electron density and $g(E_\mathrm{F})$ the electronic density of states (number of states per energy per volume) at the Fermi energy $E_\mathrm{F}$.

In this approximation the magnetization is given as the magnetic moment of one electron times the difference in densities:

$$M=\mu_\mathrm{B}(n_{\downarrow}-n_{\uparrow})=\mu_0\mu_\mathrm{B}^2g(E_\mathrm{F})H,$$

which yields a positive paramagnetic susceptibility independent of temperature:

$$\chi_\mathrm{P}=\mu_0\mu_\mathrm{B}^2g(E_\mathrm{F}).$$

The Pauli paramagnetic susceptibility is a macroscopic effect and has to be contrasted with Landau diamagnetic susceptibility which is equal to minus one third of Pauli's and also comes from delocalized electrons. The Pauli susceptibility comes from the spin interaction with the magnetic field while the Landau susceptibility comes from the spatial motion of the electrons and it is independent of the spin. In doped semiconductors the ratio between Landau's and Pauli's susceptibilities changes as the effective mass of the charge carriers $m^*$ can differ from the electron mass $m_\text{e}$.

The magnetic response calculated for a gas of electrons is not the full picture as the magnetic susceptibility coming from the ions has to be included. Additionally, these formulas may break down for confined systems that differ from the bulk, like quantum dots, or for high fields, as demonstrated in the De Haas-Van Alphen effect.

Pauli paramagnetism is named after the physicist Wolfgang Pauli. Before Pauli's theory, the lack of a strong Curie paramagnetism in metals was an open problem as the leading Drude model could not account for this contribution without the use of quantum statistics. Pauli paramagnetism and Landau diamagnetism are essentially applications of the spin and the free electron model, the first is due to intrinsic spin of electrons; the second is due to their orbital motion.

== Examples of paramagnets ==
Materials that are called "paramagnets" are most often those that exhibit, at least over an appreciable temperature range, magnetic susceptibilities that adhere to the Curie or Curie–Weiss laws. In principle any system that contains atoms, ions, or molecules with unpaired spins can be called a paramagnet, but the interactions between them need to be carefully considered.

=== Systems with minimal interactions ===
The narrowest definition would be: a system with unpaired spins that do not interact with each other. In this narrowest sense, the only pure paramagnet is a dilute gas of monatomic hydrogen atoms. Each atom has one non-interacting unpaired electron.

A gas of lithium atoms already possess two paired core electrons that produce a diamagnetic response of opposite sign. So strictly speaking, lithium is a mixed system; therefore, although admittedly, the diamagnetic component is weak and often neglected. In the case of heavier elements the diamagnetic contribution becomes more important. In the case of metallic gold, it dominates the properties.

The element hydrogen is virtually never called 'paramagnetic' because the monatomic gas is stable only at extremely high temperature: H atoms combine to form molecular H_{2} and in so doing, the magnetic moments are lost (quenched) because the spins pair. The pairing of electrons means hydrogen is diamagnetic and the same holds true for many other elements.

Although the electronic configuration of the individual atoms and ions of most elements contain unpaired spins, they are not necessarily paramagnetic because at ambient temperature, quenching is very much the rule rather than the exception. The quenching tendency is weakest for f-electrons because f (especially 4f) orbitals are radially contracted and overlap only weakly with orbitals of adjacent atoms. Consequently, the lanthanide elements with incompletely filled 4f-orbitals are paramagnetic or magnetically ordered.

μ_{eff} values for typical d^{3} and d^{5} transition metal complexes.
Material	μ_{eff}/μ_{B}
[Cr(NH_{3})_{6}]Br_{3}	3.77
K_{3}[Cr(CN)_{6}]	3.87
K_{3}[MoCl_{6}]	3.79
K_{4}[V(CN)_{6}]	3.78
[Mn(NH_{3})_{6}]Cl_{2}	5.92
(NH_{4})_{2}[Mn(SO_{4})_{2}]·6H_{2}O	5.92
NH_{4}[Fe(SO_{4})_{2}]·12H_{2}O	5.89

Thus, solid phase paramagnets are only possible if the interactions of the spins that lead to either quenching or ordering are kept at bay by the structural isolation of the magnetic centers. There are two classes of materials for which this holds:

- Molecular materials with a (isolated) paramagnetic center.
  - Good examples are coordination complexes of d- or f-metals or proteins with such centers, e.g. myoglobin. In such materials the organic part of the molecule acts as an envelope shielding the spins from their neighbors.
  - Small molecules can be stable in radical form; oxygen O_{2} is a good example. Such systems are quite rare because they tend to be rather reactive.
- Dilute systems.
  - Dissolving a paramagnetic species in a diamagnetic lattice at small concentrations, e.g. Nd^{3+} in CaCl_{2} will separate the neodymium ions at large enough distances that they do not interact. Such systems are of prime importance for what can be considered in the most sensitive method to study paramagnetic systems: EPR.

=== Systems with interactions ===
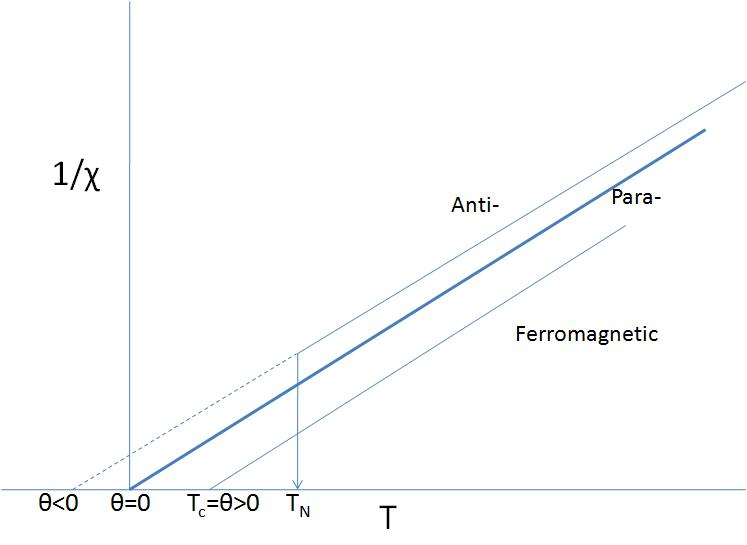
Idealized Curie–Weiss behavior; N.B. T_{C}=θ, but T_{N} is not θ. Paramagnetic regimes are denoted by solid lines. Close to T_{N} or T_{C} the behavior usually deviates from ideal.

As stated above, many materials that contain d- or f-elements do retain unquenched spins. Salts of such elements often show paramagnetic behavior but at low enough temperatures the magnetic moments may order. It is not uncommon to call such materials 'paramagnets', when referring to their paramagnetic behavior above their Curie or Néel-points, particularly if such temperatures are very low or have never been properly measured. Even for iron it is not uncommon to say that iron becomes a paramagnet above its relatively high Curie-point. In that case the Curie-point is seen as a phase transition between a ferromagnet and a 'paramagnet'. The word paramagnet now merely refers to the linear response of the system to an applied field, the temperature dependence of which requires an amended version of Curie's law, known as the Curie–Weiss law:

$$\mathbf{M} = \frac{C}{T- \theta}\mathbf{H}$$

This amended law includes a term θ that describes the exchange interaction that is present albeit overcome by thermal motion. The sign of θ depends on whether ferro- or antiferromagnetic interactions dominate and it is seldom exactly zero, except in the dilute, isolated cases mentioned above.

Obviously, the paramagnetic Curie–Weiss description above T_{N} or T_{C} is a rather different interpretation of the word "paramagnet" as it does not imply the absence of interactions, but rather that the magnetic structure is random in the absence of an external field at these sufficiently high temperatures. Even if θ is close to zero this does not mean that there are no interactions, just that the aligning ferro- and the anti-aligning antiferromagnetic ones cancel. An additional complication is that the interactions are often different in different directions of the crystalline lattice (anisotropy), leading to complicated magnetic structures once ordered.

Randomness of the structure also applies to the many metals that show a net paramagnetic response over a broad temperature range. They do not follow a Curie type law as function of temperature however; often they are more or less temperature-independent. This type of behavior is of an itinerant nature and better called Pauli-paramagnetism, but it is not unusual to see, for example, the metal aluminium being called a "paramagnet", even though interactions are strong enough to give this element very good electrical conductivity.

=== Superparamagnets ===
Some materials show induced magnetic behavior that follows a Curie type law but with exceptionally large values for the Curie constants. These materials are known as superparamagnets. They are characterized by a strong ferromagnetic or ferrimagnetic type of coupling into domains of a limited size that behave independently from one another. The bulk properties of such a system resembles that of a paramagnet, but on a microscopic level they are ordered. The materials do show an ordering temperature above which the behavior reverts to ordinary paramagnetism (with interaction). Ferrofluids are a good example, but the phenomenon can also occur inside solids, e.g., when dilute paramagnetic centers are introduced in a strong itinerant medium of ferromagnetic coupling such as when Fe is substituted in TlCu_{2}Se_{2} or the alloy AuFe. Such systems contain ferromagnetically coupled clusters that freeze out at lower temperatures. They are also called mictomagnets.

== See also ==
- Magnetochemistry
