= Landé g-factor =

G-factor for electron with spin and orbital angular momentum

In physics, the Landé g-factor is a particular example of a g-factor, namely for an electron with both spin and orbital angular momenta. It is named after Alfred Landé, who first described it in 1921.

In atomic physics, the Landé g-factor is a multiplicative term appearing in the expression for the energy levels of an atom in a weak magnetic field. The quantum states of electrons in atomic orbitals are normally degenerate in energy, with these degenerate states all sharing the same angular momentum. When the atom is placed in a weak magnetic field, however, the degeneracy is lifted. The Landé g-factor applies only at the free-atom limit, and thus is only appropriate for atoms, ions, and complexes where LS coupling applies such as those of most of the lanthanides; conversely it is inappropriate for first-row transition metal complexes due to their strong spin-orbit coupling and the breakdown of LS coupling.

== Description ==
The factor comes about during the calculation of the first-order perturbation in the energy of an atom when a weak uniform magnetic field (that is, weak in comparison to the system's internal magnetic field) is applied to the system. Formally we can write the factor as,

$$g_J= g_L\frac{J(J+1)-S(S+1)+L(L+1)}{2J(J+1)}+g_S\frac{J(J+1)+S(S+1)-L(L+1)}{2J(J+1)}.$$

The orbital $g_L$ is equal to 1, and under the approximation $g_S = 2$, the above expression simplifies to

$$g_J = 1+\frac{J(J+1)+S(S+1)-L(L+1)}{2J(J+1)}.$$

Here, J is the total electronic angular momentum, L is the orbital angular momentum, and S is the spin angular momentum. Because $S=1/2$ for electrons, one often sees this formula written with 3/4 in place of $S(S+1)$. The quantities g_{L} and g_{S} are the orbital and spin g-factors of an electron, respectively (taken as positive quantities by convention). For an $S=0$ atom, $g_J=1$ and for an $L=0$ atom, $g_J=2$.

If we wish to know the g-factor for an atom with total atomic angular momentum $\vec{F}=\vec{I}+\vec{J}$ (nucleus + electrons), such that the total atomic angular momentum quantum number can take values of $F=J+I, J+I-1, \dots,|J-I|$, giving

$$\begin{align}
g_F &= g_J\frac{F(F+1)-I(I+1)+J(J+1)}{2F(F+1)}+g_I\frac{\mu_\text{N}}{\mu_\text{B}}\frac{F(F+1)+I(I+1)-J(J+1)}{2F(F+1)} \\
&\approx g_J\frac{F(F+1)-I(I+1)+J(J+1)}{2F(F+1)}
\end{align}$$

Here $\mu_\text{B}$ is the Bohr magneton and $\mu_\text{N}$ is the nuclear magneton. This last approximation is justified because $\mu_\text{N}$ is smaller than $\mu_\text{B}$ by the ratio of the electron mass to the proton mass.

== A derivation ==
The following working is a common derivation.

Both orbital angular momentum and spin angular momentum of electron contribute to the magnetic moment. In particular, each of them alone contributes to the magnetic moment by the following form

$$\vec \mu_L= -\vec L g_L \mu_{\rm B}/\hbar$$
$$\vec \mu_S= -\vec S g_S \mu_{\rm B}/\hbar$$
$$\vec \mu_J= \vec \mu_L + \vec \mu_S$$

where

$$g_L = 1$$
$$g_S \approx 2$$

Note that negative signs in the above expressions are because an electron carries negative charge, and the value of $g_S$ can be derived naturally from the Dirac equation. The total magnetic moment $\vec \mu_J$, as a vector operator, does not lie on the direction of total angular momentum $\vec J = \vec L+\vec S$, because the g-factors for orbital and spin part are different. However, due to the Wigner–Eckart theorem, its expectation value does effectively lie on the direction of $\vec J$ which can be employed in the determination of the g-factor according to the rules of angular momentum coupling. In particular, the g-factor is defined as a consequence of the theorem itself

$$\langle J,J_\text{z}|\vec \mu_J|J,J'_\text{z}\rangle = -g_J\mu_{\rm B}\langle J,J_\text{z}|\vec J|J,J'_\text{z}\rangle$$

Therefore,

$$\langle J,J_\text{z}|\vec \mu_J|J,J'_\text{z}\rangle\cdot\langle J,J'_\text{z}|\vec J|J,J_\text{z}\rangle = -g_J\mu_{\rm B}\langle J,J_\text{z}|\vec J|J,J'_\text{z}\rangle\cdot\langle J,J'_\text{z}|\vec J|J,J_\text{z}\rangle$$
$$\sum_{J'_\text{z}}\langle J,J_\text{z}|\vec \mu_J|J,J'_\text{z}\rangle\cdot\langle J,J'_\text{z}|\vec J|J,J_\text{z}\rangle = -\sum_{J'_\text{z}}g_J\mu_{\rm B}\langle J,J_\text{z}|\vec J|J,J'_\text{z}\rangle \cdot\langle J,J'_\text{z}|\vec J|J,J_\text{z}\rangle$$
$$\langle J,J_\text{z}|\vec \mu_J\cdot \vec J|J,J_\text{z}\rangle = -g_J\mu_{\rm B}\langle J,J_\text{z}|\vec J\cdot\vec J|J,J_\text{z}\rangle = -g_J\mu_{\rm B} \quad \hbar^2 J(J+1)$$

One gets

$$\begin{align}
g_J\langle J,J_\text{z}|\vec J\cdot\vec J|J,J_\text{z} \rangle &= \langle J,J_\text{z}|g_L {{\vec L}\cdot {\vec J}}+g_S  {{\vec S} \cdot {\vec J}}| J,J_\text{z}\rangle \\
&= \langle J,J_\text{z}|g_L {\left[\vec L^2+\frac{1}{2}\left(\vec J^2-\vec L^2-\vec S^2\right)\right]}+g_S  {\left[\vec S^2+\frac{1}{2}\left(\vec J^2-\vec L^2-\vec S^2\right)\right]}|J,J_\text{z}\rangle \\
&=  \frac{g_L \hbar^2}{2}[ J(J+1)+L(L+1)-S(S+1)]+  \frac{g_S \hbar^2}{2}[ J(J+1)-L(L+1)+S(S+1)]\\
g_J &= g_L  \frac{J(J+1)+L(L+1)-S(S+1)}{{2J(J+1)}}+g_S  \frac{J(J+1)-L(L+1)+S(S+1)}{{2J(J+1)}}
\end{align}$$

== Table of values ==
The following table gives the calculated Lande g-factors for some common term symbols in the approximation $g_S=2$.

Term_symbol	S	L	J	g_{J}
^{2}S_{1/2}	1/2	0	1/2	2
^{3}S_{1}	1	0	1	2
^{4}S_{3/2}	3/2	0	3/2	2
^{5}S_{2}	2	0	2	2
^{6}S_{5/2}	5/2	0	5/2	2
^{7}S_{3}	3	0	3	2
^{1}P_{1}	0	1	1	1
^{2}P_{1/2}	1/2	1	1/2	2/3
^{2}P_{3/2}	1/2	1	3/2	4/3
^{3}P_{0}	1	1	0	—
^{3}P_{1}	1	1	1	3/2
^{3}P_{2}	1	1	2	3/2
^{4}P_{1/2}	3/2	1	1/2	8/3
^{4}P_{3/2}	3/2	1	3/2	26/15
^{4}P_{5/2}	3/2	1	5/2	8/5
^{5}P_{1}	2	1	1	5/2
^{5}P_{2}	2	1	2	11/6
^{5}P_{3}	2	1	3	5/3
^{6}P_{3/2}	5/2	1	3/2	12/5
^{6}P_{5/2}	5/2	1	5/2	66/35
^{6}P_{7/2}	5/2	1	7/2	12/7
^{7}P_{2}	3	1	2	7/3
^{7}P_{3}	3	1	3	23/12
^{7}P_{4}	3	1	4	7/4
^{1}D_{2}	0	2	2	1
^{2}D_{3/2}	1/2	2	3/2	4/5
^{2}D_{5/2}	1/2	2	5/2	6/5
^{3}D_{1}	1	2	1	1/2
^{3}D_{2}	1	2	2	7/6
^{3}D_{3}	1	2	3	4/3
^{4}D_{1/2}	3/2	2	1/2	0
^{4}D_{3/2}	3/2	2	3/2	6/5
^{4}D_{5/2}	3/2	2	5/2	48/35
^{4}D_{7/2}	3/2	2	7/2	10/7
^{5}D_{0}	2	2	0	—
^{5}D_{1}	2	2	1	3/2
^{5}D_{2}	2	2	2	3/2
^{5}D_{3}	2	2	3	3/2
^{5}D_{4}	2	2	4	3/2
^{7}D_{5}	3	2	5	8/5
^{1}F_{3}	0	3	3	1
^{2}F_{5/2}	1/2	3	5/2	6/7
^{2}F_{7/2}	1/2	3	7/2	8/7
^{3}F_{2}	1	3	2	2/3
^{3}F_{3}	1	3	3	13/12
^{3}F_{4}	1	3	4	5/4
^{4}F_{3/2}	3/2	3	3/2	2/5
^{4}F_{5/2}	3/2	3	5/2	36/35
^{4}F_{7/2}	3/2	3	7/2	26/21
^{4}F_{9/2}	3/2	3	9/2	4/3
^{5}F_{1}	2	3	1	0
^{5}F_{2}	2	3	2	1
^{5}F_{3}	2	3	3	5/4
^{5}F_{4}	2	3	4	27/20
^{5}F_{5}	2	3	5	7/5
^{6}F_{1/2}	5/2	3	1/2	−2/3
^{6}F_{3/2}	5/2	3	3/2	16/15
^{6}F_{5/2}	5/2	3	5/2	46/35
^{6}F_{7/2}	5/2	3	7/2	88/63
^{6}F_{9/2}	5/2	3	9/2	142/99
^{6}F_{11/2}	5/2	3	11/2	16/11
^{7}F_{0}	3	3	0	—
^{7}F_{1}	3	3	1	3/2
^{7}F_{2}	3	3	2	3/2
^{7}F_{3}	3	3	3	3/2
^{7}F_{4}	3	3	4	3/2
^{7}F_{5}	3	3	5	3/2
^{7}F_{6}	3	3	6	3/2

== See also ==
- Einstein–de Haas effect,
- Zeeman effect,
- g-factor (physics).
