= Marthe Weiss =

French scientist (1885–1953)

- Born: Marthe Camille Henriette Klein; June 12, 1885; Nancy, France
- Died: 1953; Lyon, France
- Education: École normale supérieure de jeunes filles; University of Cambridge
- Spouse: Pierre Weiss (m. 1922; died 1940)
- Scientific career
- Fields: Physics
- Workplaces: Radium Institute

Marthe Weiss (née Klein; 1885–1953) was a French scientist and teacher, remembered for introducing Marie Curie to Calvaire on the Mediterranean coast in 1919, and for contributing to her laboratory shortly afterwards.

== Early life and education ==
Born in Nancy on 12 June 1985, Marthe Camille Henriette Klein was the daughter of Pierre Klein and his wife Camille, née Matter.

She attended the École normale supérieure de jeunes filles in Sèvres from 1905 to 1908 when she was placed first in the physics section of the agrégation, a competitive examination providing access to secondary school teaching.

== Career ==
Klein first taught at the girls' lycée in Saumur from October 1908. Thereafter she taught in girls' lycées in Marseille and Bordeaux until 1913 when she received a grant allowing her to study for a year at the University of Cambridge. When she returned to France in 1914, despite the beginning of the First World War, she was reassigned to the lycée in Bordeaux. In October 1916, she began to teach in Versailles, replacing Lucie Blanquiès, another of Curie's collaborators. In the summer of 1917, Klein trained nurses on a voluntary basis in Curie's Radium Institute, showing them how to handle radiological equipment. Curie then successfully arranged for Klein's attachment to her laboratory for the two academic years from 1917 to 1919 as an radiological instructor for nurses. Together with Irène Curie, she developed various methods for measuring radioactivity.

It was in September 1919 that Klein revealed the Mediterranean coast to Marie Curie, accompanying her to Cavalaire-sur-Mer, a resort in south-eastern France. She returned to the laboratory before Curie and wrote a number of letters calling for its reorganization at a time when some 35 nurses per month were receiving training with insufficient equipment. Thereafter Klein left the laboratory to return to teaching.

Following an introduction by Curie's friends Aimé and Eugénie Cotton, Klein married the physicist Pierre Weiss on 18 July 1922. As Pierre Weiss had just been appointed professor of physics at the University of Strasbourg, the couple moved there but Marthe was unable to find work as a teacher until 1932. She worked there until 1940 when, after the Nazi occupation, she moved with her husband to Lyon in the Zone libre. There she was able to teach in the girls' lycée.

Pierre Weiss died on 24 October 1940 but Marthe Weiss continued to teach at Lyon until March 1951. She died in Lyon in 1953.

== See also ==
- List of women associated with Marie Curie and Irène Joliot-Curie
