= ASTM F883 =

Standard performance specification for padlocks

ASTM F883 is a standard performance specification for padlocks.

This standard was created by the American Standard for Testing and Materials (ASTM). ASTM International, founded in 1898, is an international standards developing organization that develops and publishes standards for a wide range of materials, products, systems, and services.

This standard was published by ASTM F12.50 which is a committee specializes about locking device. The standards deal with requirement regarding security for padlocks. The standards describe padlocks and explain cycle tests, operational tests, environmental tests, forcing tests, and surreptitious entry tests.

The main keywords to present this standard are cutting shackle; padlock impact; padlock testing; salt UV testing; and shackle wedge.

== See also ==
- Materials property
- Standards organizations
- Technical standard
- International standards
- Physical security

== Sources ==
- Veridion ISO 27001 security compliance directory
- Best Access System - Mechanical & Electronic Access Control
- ISEE - Safety and Security Information For Federal Explosives Licensees and Permittees
- United States Tests Laboratory
