= Edmond Bauer =

French physicist

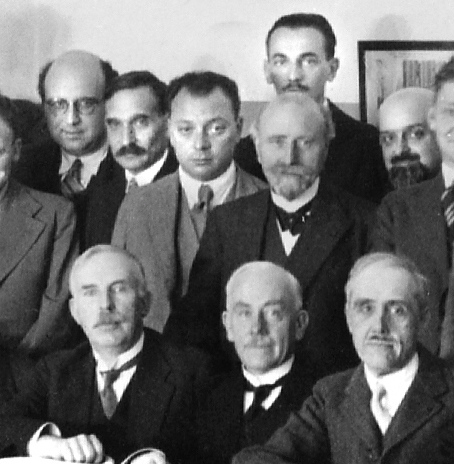
- Bauer (standing second from left) in 1933 with Wolfgang Pauli (standing third from left) and Ernest Rutherford (sitting first from left)
- Born: October 26, 1880; Paris
- Died: October 17, 1963 (aged 82); Paris
- Education: University of Paris
- Spouse: Renee Kahn
- Scientific career
- Institutions: University of Strasbourg, Collège de France
- Thesis: Recherches sur le rayonnement (1912)

Edmond Bauer (26 October 1880 – 17 October 1963) was a French physicist who was a student of Marie Curie and Paul Langevin who made studies on radiation in his early career. He was from a Jewish family and suffered during World War II during the period of Nazi control.

Bauer was born in Paris in a family of businesspeople and was educated at the lycées Condorcet and Janson de Sailly before graduating from the University of Paris. He studied under Jean Perrin, Heinrich Rubens, Marie Curie, and Walther Nernst. His work on blackbody radiation was under Paul Langevin. Bauer married in 1911 to Renee Kahn. He was enlisted during World War I and was wounded at Charleroi and captured by Germans. He was released after three years after which he moved to Switzerland. The family reunited and he was allowed to return to France on the condition that he would not join military service. He worked at the University of Strasbourg with Pierre Weiss and in 1928 he moved to Collège de France. He refused to take refuge in the USA during World War II and stayed back in Vichy. His daughter was captured by the Gestapo and survived her incarceration in Ravensbrück, while he was forced to move to Switzerland. His oldest son was also arrested and died in Neuengamme.

His contributions to physics include the determination of the Stefan constant, examination of spectra, hydrogen bonding in water, light dispersion, magnetism, quantum mechanics and chemical kinetics.
