= École normale supérieure de jeunes filles =

French institute of higher education in Sèvres

Coordinates: 48.822439°N 2.331312°E

The École normale supérieure de jeunes filles (also École normale supérieure de Sèvres) was a French institute of higher education, in Sèvres, now a commune in the suburbs of Paris. The school educated girls only, especially as teachers for the secondary education system. It was founded on 29 July 1881 on the initiative of Camille Sée, following the Sée-inspired act of the legislature which established lycées for girls. In 1985, it merged with the École normale supérieure of the rue d'Ulm.

== History ==
On the school's founding, French Minister of National Education Jules Ferry named the philosopher and educator Julie Velten Favre director of the institution. The school was initially housed in the former buildings of the Manufacture nationale de Sèvres, from which it was ejected in 1940; it was reinstated in the Boulevard Jourdan, in the 14th arrondissement. It existed until 1985, when it merged with the École normale supérieure, Rue d'Ulm, forming a co-educational school.

== Directors (1881–1988) ==
- Julie Favre (Madame Jules Favre) 1881–1896
- Madame Henri Marion née Jeanne Marie Hall: 1896-1906
- Louise Belugou : 1906–1919
- Anne Amieux : 1919–1936
- Eugénie Cotton : 1936–1941
- Edmée Hatinguais : 1941–1944
- Lucy Prenant : 1944–1956
- Marie-Jeanne Durry : 1956–1974
- Josiane Serre : 1974–1988

== Notable alumni ==
- Rose Celli
- Yvonne Choquet-Bruhat (1923–2025), French mathematical physicist
- Assia Djebar
- Marie Duflo (1940–2019), French probability theorist
- Jeanne Galzy
- Christiane Klapisch-Zuber, French historian, anthropologist and academic
- Paulette Libermann (1919–2007), French mathematician
- Éliane Montel (1898–1993), French physicist and chemist
- Luce Pietri (1931–2024), French historian
- Angèle Pompéi (1898–1990), French Corsican scientist who worked at the Curie laboratory from 1929
- Marthe Weiss née Klein (1885–1953), French scientist and teacher, worked with Marie Curie

== Faculty ==
- Élie Cartan
- Eugénie Cotton
- Marie Curie
- Jacqueline Ferrand
- Paul Langevin
- André Lichnerowicz
- Jean Perrin

== See also ==
- École normale supérieure
