= Edmée Hatinguais =

- Born: Edmée Lucienne Marc; 24 July 1896; Bolbec, Normandy
- Died: 31 October 1972 (aged 76); Garches
- Resting place: Cimetière des Bruyères in Sèvres
- Occupations: Teacher, educationalist, inspectrice générale de l'Instruction publique
- Employer: École normale supérieure de jeunes filles

Edmée Hatinguais (24 July 1896 - 31 October 1972) was a French teacher, educationalist and inspectrice générale de l'Instruction publique (French Ministry of Education). She was headmistress of the l'École normale supérieure de jeunes filles, a leading institute for higher education for women, between 1941 and 1944, during the Vichy regime.

== Early life and education ==
Edmée Lucienne Marc was born in 1896 in Bolbec, in Normandy. She earned her agrégation in literature in 1919, then taught for a few years. In 1921, she married Armand Hatinguais (1895–1984) and took his surname.

== Career ==
Edmée Hatinguais was appointed headmistress of the Lycée Fromentin in Algiers in 1928, remaining in the post for a decade, before returning to Paris to head the Lycée Racine in 1938.

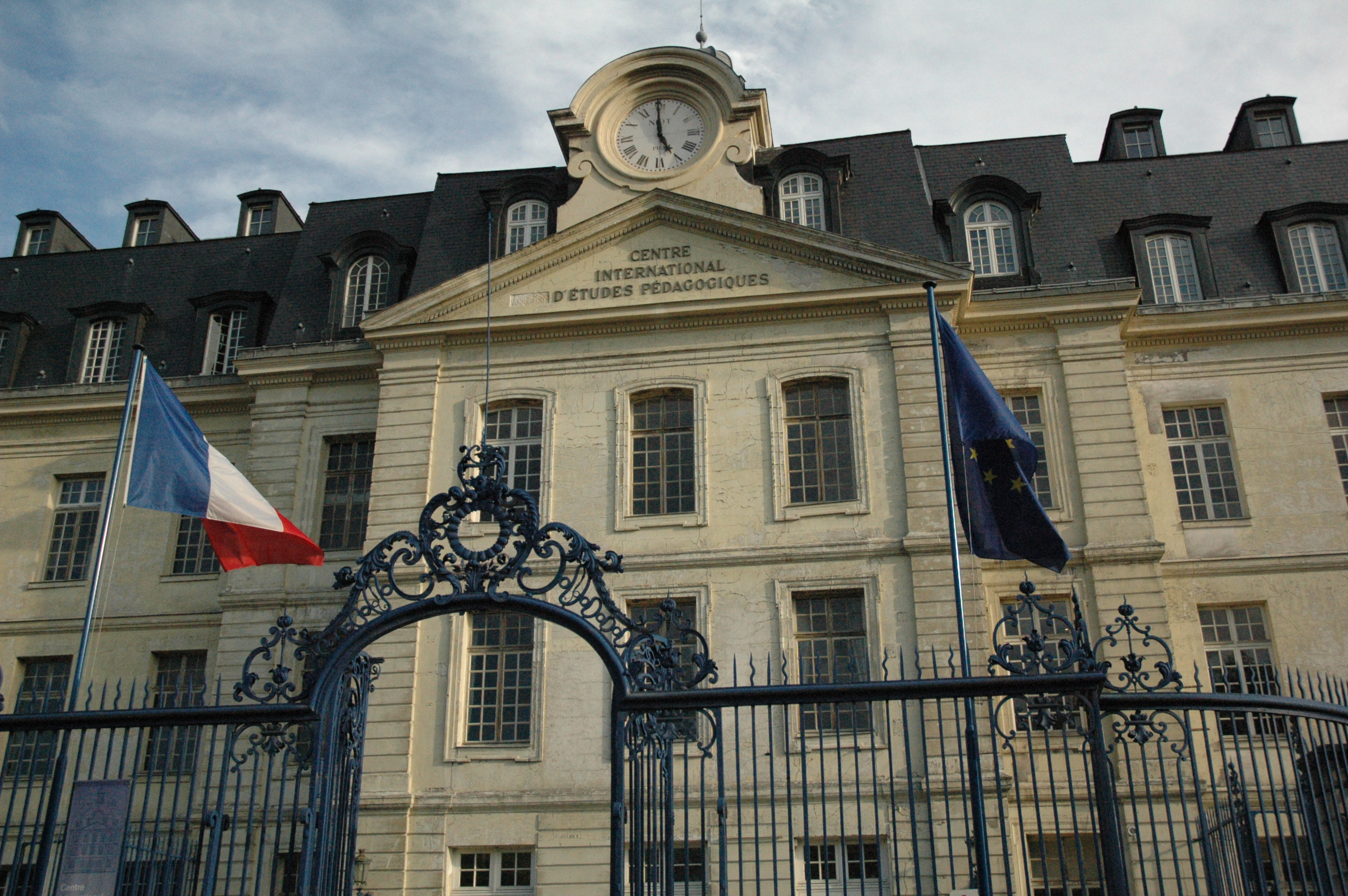
Le Centre international d'études pédagogiques

Hatinguais was appointed headmistress of the École normale supérieure de jeunes filles by a decree dated 31 July 1941 issued by Jérôme Carcopino, then Secretary of State for National Education and Young People in the Vichy government. She replaced Eugénie Cotton, who had just been compulsorily retired by the Vichy regime due to her communist activities and the Law of 11 October 1940, which required women over the age of 50 to retire. Hatinguais oversaw the school's relocation to Paris from Sèvres.

Following the liberation of France, Edmée Hatinguais was suspended on 24 August 1944. Eugénie Cotton was offered reinstatement to her former post as headmistress of the school by Henri Wallon, then Secretary-General for National Education, but Cotton did not wish to resume her duties, so philosopher Lucy Prenant was appointed to the role instead.

On 26 January 1945 Hatinguais was tasked with organising the Centre international d'études pédagogiques (CIEP), founded by Gustave Monod and housed in the former buildings of the École normale supérieure de Sèvres. She headed the organisation from 1945 until her retirement in 1966.

Edmée Hatinguais died in a car accident in Garches on 31 October 1972 and was buried in the Cimetière des Bruyères in Sèvres.

== Awards ==
- 1956: inspectrice générale de l'Instruction publique
- 1966: Commandeur de la Légion d'honneur
