= Elastocaloric materials =

Class of materials

Elastocaloric materials are a class of advanced materials. These materials show a substantial change in temperature when mechanical stress is applied and then removed.

This phenomenon, known as the elastocaloric effect, is the reversible thermal response of the material to mechanical loading and unloading. The effect is often caused by changes in entropy within the material's structure. This can be due to phase transformations or reorientation of crystalline domains. Unlike conventional materials, elastocaloric materials can experience substantial temperature changes under mechanical stress. This makes them promising for solid-state refrigeration and heating applications.

The relevance of elastocaloric materials lies in their potential to revolutionize the cooling and heating systems that are integral to modern life. Traditional cooling technologies, such as vapor-compression refrigeration, rely on harmful refrigerants that contribute to global warming and have significant energy consumption. These materials can potentially replace conventional systems, leading to reduced greenhouse gas emissions and lower energy usage.

== Elastocaloric Effect ==
The elastocaloric effect is a complex thermomechanical phenomenon in which a material experiences a temperature change as a result of mechanical stress. When mechanical stress is applied to an elastocaloric material—through stretching, compressing, or bending—the material can either absorb heat from its surroundings (resulting in cooling) or release heat (resulting in heating). This effect arises primarily due to a change in the material's entropy. The change in entropy is often linked to a phase transition or the reorientation of the material's crystalline structure.

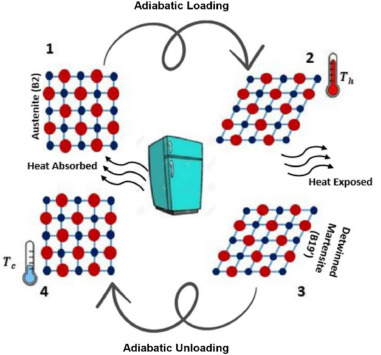
Elastocaloric Effect

Shape memory alloys (SMAs) have the elastocaloric effect. This effect is closely connected to the reversible phase transition between different crystal structures. For example, the transition from austenite to martensite. During this transition, the entropy of the system changes. This is due to the rearrangement of atoms and changes in internal energy. The transformation from a high-symmetry austenitic phase to a low-symmetry martensitic phase can either absorb or release latent heat. This depends on whether the process is endothermic or exothermic. The temperature change (ΔT) depends on several factors: material composition - the specific elements and their concentrations in the alloy can significantly influence the phase transition temperature and the associated entropy change; microstructure - the size, distribution, and orientation of grains within the material can affect the mechanical properties and the efficiency of the phase transition; mechanical load - the type and magnitude of the applied stress determine the extent of the phase transition and, consequently, the temperature change. By controlling these factors, the elastocaloric effect can be finely tuned. This allows for the design of materials with tailored thermal responses for specific applications.

== Materials ==
Elastocaloric materials are diverse and include a range of shape memory alloys (SMAs), which are among the most widely studied due to their pronounced phase transition properties. Notable examples include:

- Nickel-Titanium (NiTi) Alloys: Known for their excellent mechanical properties and significant temperature changes during the austenite-martensite phase transformation, NiTi alloys are highly efficient elastocaloric materials.
- Copper-Based Alloys: Alloys such as Cu-Zn-Al and Cu-Al-Ni have also shown promising elastocaloric properties, with the added benefit of being less expensive than NiTi.
- Iron-Based Alloys: These materials, including Fe-Pd and Fe-Ni, offer potential for elastocaloric applications, especially at lower temperatures.
- Elastomers and Ceramics: Some polymer-based materials and ceramics exhibit elastocaloric effects due to entropy changes associated with stretching or bending. These materials can provide unique advantages, such as flexibility and lower weight.

The choice of material for elastocaloric applications depends on several criteria, including the desired operating temperature range, the required mechanical strength, the material's durability under cyclic loading (fatigue resistance), and cost considerations.

== Comparison with Other Caloric Effects ==
The elastocaloric effect is part of a broader category of caloric effects that can be utilized for solid-state cooling technologies. Other notable caloric effects include:

- Magnetocaloric effect (MCE): This effect involves a temperature change in a material due to a change in magnetic field. It is based on the magnetocaloric materials' ability to undergo an entropy change when subjected to a magnetic field, which aligns magnetic domains and reduces entropy, leading to heating or cooling.
- Electrocaloric effect (ECE): Involves temperature changes due to the application or removal of an electric field. Electrocaloric materials experience a change in polarization and entropy when an electric field is applied, causing the material to either absorb or release heat.

Compared to the magnetocaloric and electrocaloric effects, the elastocaloric effect offers several distinct advantages:

- No Need for External Fields: Elastocaloric materials do not need external magnetic or electric fields. These fields can be energy-intensive to generate and control. This makes elastocaloric systems potentially simpler and more cost-effective.
- Higher Temperature Changes: Elastocaloric materials can show larger temperature changes when a mechanical stress is applied. The temperature changes are bigger compared to the changes from magnetocaloric or electrocaloric effects. This can lead to higher cooling efficiencies.
- Material Diversity: A wide range of materials can exhibit elastocaloric properties, offering more options for specific applications and potentially lower material costs.

These attributes make elastocaloric materials a promising avenue for developing next-generation cooling technologies that are more energy-efficient and environmentally friendly than current systems.
