= Pierre Weiss =

French physicist (1865–1940)

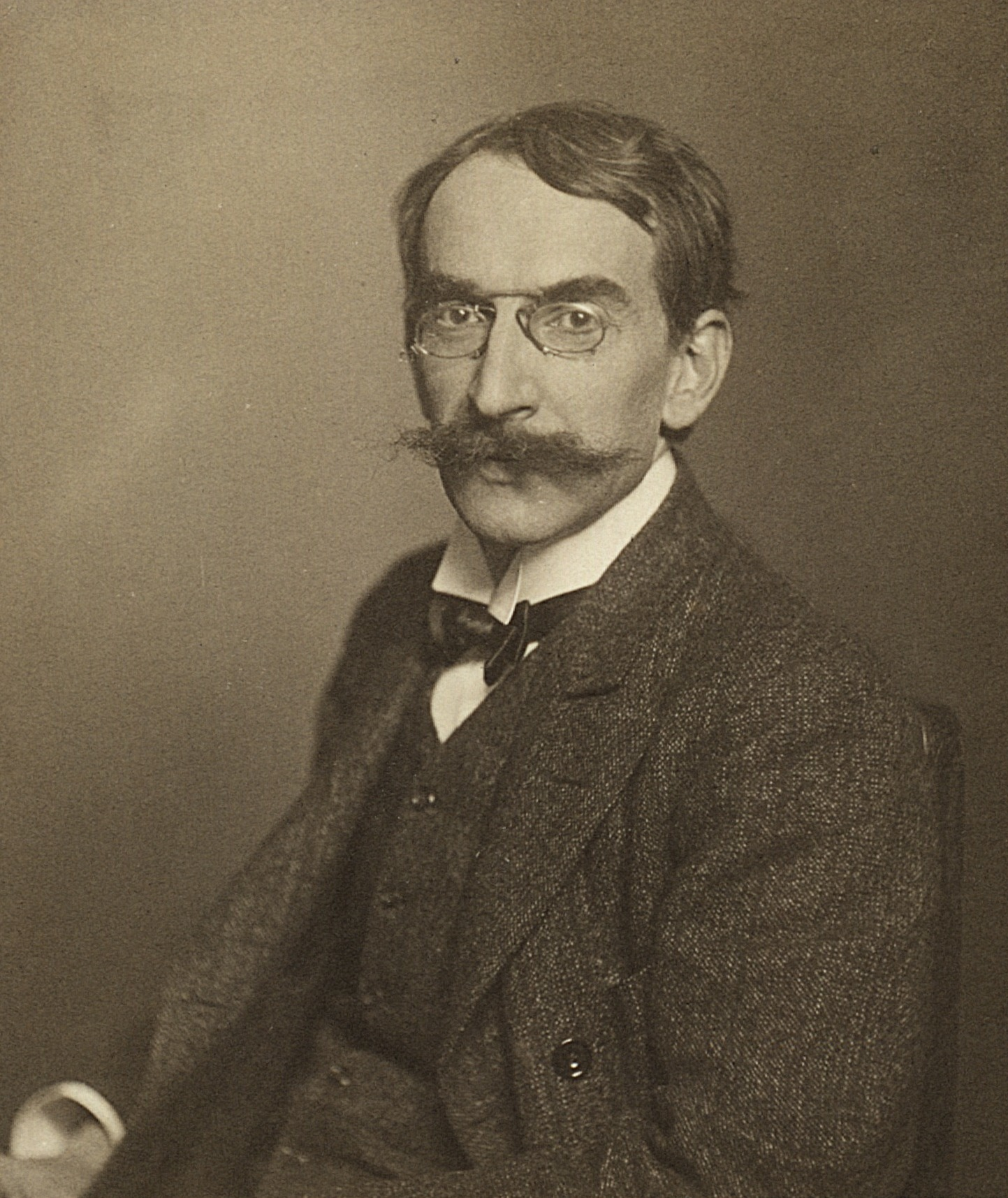
- Born: 25 March 1865; Mulhouse, France
- Died: 24 October 1940 (aged 75); Lyon, France
- Known for: Curie–Weiss law Mean field theory Magnetic domain Weiss magneton Magnetocaloric effect Cotton-Weiss method
- Spouse(s): Jane Rancès (m. 1895–1919) Marthe Weiss (m. 1922)
- Awards: Commandeur of the Legion of Honor (1935)
- Scientific career
- Fields: Physics, magnetism
- Workplaces: University of Rennes, University of Lyon, ETH Zurich, University of Strasbourg,
- Thesis: Recherches sur l'aimantation de la magnétite cristallisée et de quelques alliages de fer et d’antimoine (1896)
- Doctoral advisor: Jules Violle; Marcel Brillouin
- Doctoral students: Louis Néel; Charles Sadron

Pierre-Ernest Weiss (25 March 1865 – 24 October 1940) was a French physicist who specialized in magnetism. He developed the domain theory of ferromagnetism in 1907. Weiss domains and the Weiss magneton are named after him. Weiss also developed the molecular or mean field theory, which is often called Weiss-mean-field theory, that led to the discovery of the Curie–Weiss law. Alongside Auguste Piccard, Pierre Weiss is considered one of the first discoverers of the magnetocaloric effect in 1917.

Pierre Weiss made several experimental discoveries that led to the development of the strongest electromagnets of the beginning of the 20th century. He worked at the universities of Rennes, Lyon, ETH Zurich where he was raised, and finally at Strasbourg. In these academic institutions he founded several renown laboratories.

During his lifetime, Weiss was nominated 23 times for the Nobel Prize in Physics.

== Early life and education ==
Pierre Weiss was born in Mulhouse the 25 March 1865, where he was the first born of Émile Weiss and Ida Schlumberger. At the age of 5, Alsace was annexed to Germany. Weiss conducted his secondary studies at Mulhouse. He later left to continue higher education at the Swiss Federal Institute of Technology in Zurich (ETH), where he obtained the diploma of mechanical engineer in 1887 as the first in the grade ranking of his class. At the age of majority, he decided to take the French nationality instead of the German one. In 1888, he practiced for the entry exam of the École Normale Supérieure (ENS) at the Lycée Saint-Louis, Paris, where he was admitted. After his years at the ENS, he remained there as a teacher assistant while in parallel he obtained his license in physical sciences and mathematical sciences at the Faculty of Sciences of Paris. During his time in Paris, he met several colleagues who will become famous mathematicians like Élie Cartan, Henri Lebesgue, and Émile Borel, and famous physicists like Aimé Cotton, Jean Perrin, and Paul Langevin.

In 1895, he won the title of maître de conférences (lecturer) at the Faculty of Sciences of the University of Rennes. In 1896, he defends his doctoral thesis in physical sciences, related to the study of the magnetization of crystallized magnetite and some iron and antimony alloys, in front of the Faculty of Science of the University of Paris. His supervisors were Jules Violle and Marcel Brillouin, and the thesis jury comprised Charles Friedel, Edmond Bouty and Henry Pellatt.

== Professional career ==
The Dreyfus affair burst during this time. According to the witnesses testimony, collected by Nicolas Ballet, Pierre Weiss joined the academics that defended Alfred Dreyfus, who was also of Alsace origin (born in Mulhouse) and another former ETH student. This position was controversial during his time at Rennes, so Weiss later preferred to teach at the University of Lyon in 1899 due to this issue.

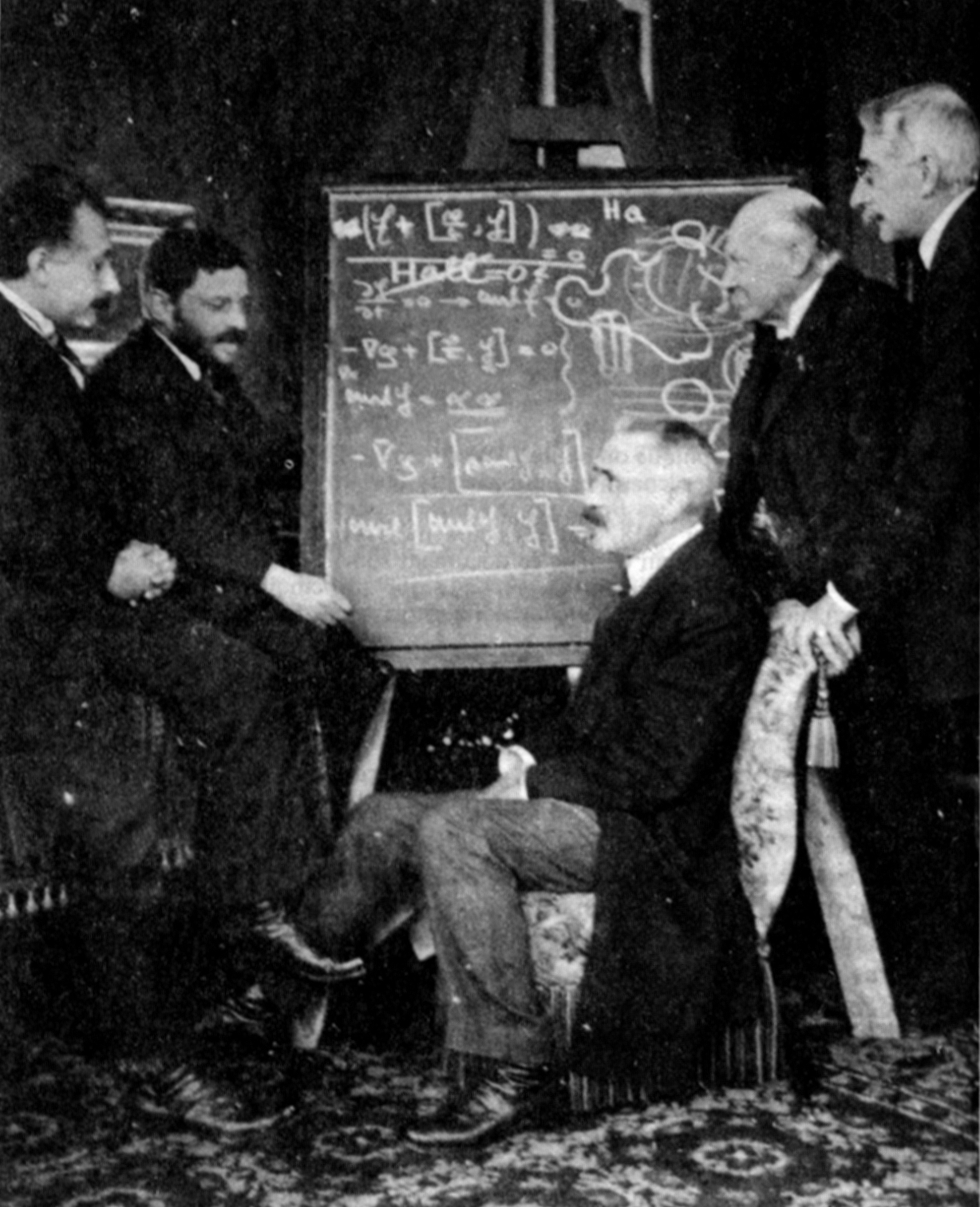
Albert Einstein, Paul Ehrenfest, Paul Langevin, Heike Kamerlingh Onnes and Pierre Weiss at Kamerlingh Onnes' home at Leiden.

Even when Pierre Weiss did take the mantle of professor at Lyon, he later accepted the ETH Zurich proposal to become physics professor and director of the Institute of Physics in 1902. In 1907, he published an important work on the nature of ferromagnetism where he introduced the concept of molecular field, a precursor idea to mean field theory. It was at this moment in his life that he met Albert Einstein and Peter Debye, also professors in Zurich. During World War I, he came back to France where he worked with Aimé Cotton in the development of an acoustic system for tracking artillery, known as the Cotton-Weiss method.

In 1919, Strasbourg was no longer part of the German Empire but returned to being a part of France. Even when the University of Strasbourg (as Kaiser-Wilhelms-Universität de Strasbourg) benefited from important German investment, Weiss had to participate in several endeavours that had to be performed to reintegrate the institution to the French system (as Université de Strasbourg). The French president Raymond Poincaré declared that the University of Strasbourg had to outperform its precedent German counterpart. In this manner, many faculties and subordinate institutes were also created to promote research. In this environment, Pierre Weiss chose to become physics professor at the Faculty of Physics of the University of Strasbourg and director of the Institute of Physics. He also founded in Strasbourg an institute focused on the research of magnetism, similar to the one he founded in Zurich. He gathered in Strasbourg many of his collaborators from Zurich, such as Gabriel Foëx, Robert Forrer and Edmond Bauer. Some of Weiss's remarkable students included Swiss explorer and inventor Auguste Piccard, Spanish physicist Blas Cabrera, and Louis Néel, French Nobel laureate in physics for his work on magnetism.

Louis Néel, young associate from the ENS, arrived at Weiss's laboratory to prepare his thesis in 1928. He became his assistant in 1932 and succeeded Weiss at his position in the Chair of Physics at the University of Strasbourg in 1937.

== Personal life ==
In October 1896, Pierre Weiss married Jane Rancès in Paris. Their daughter, Nicole, later married the French mathematician Henri Cartan.

Widowed in 1919, Weiss married for a second time in 1922, to physicist Marthe Klein, who he was introduced to by Aimé and Eugénie Cotton. In 1939, Pierre Weiss followed his friend Jean Perrin to the University of Lyon where he died in 1940.

== Physical description and personality ==
According to Francis Perrin, son of Weiss's friend Jean Perrin,

Weiss was thin and rather tall. Distinguished looking and extremely courteous, he wore a pince-nez and wing collar that gave him an air of elegance. His hair and large moustache became completely white when he was still quite young.

Louis Néel remarked the political fervour of Weiss, who supported Popular front which was badly seen in the mostly conservative population of Strasbourg of the time.

== Important works ==
- Sur le diamagnétisme des ions
- Sur l'interpretation énergétique du champ moléculaire et l'aimantation paramagnétique
- G. Foëx & P. Weiss (1926), Le magnétisme, Armand Colin, Section Physique N°71.
