= Julie Favre =

French philosopher and educator

Julie Velten Favre
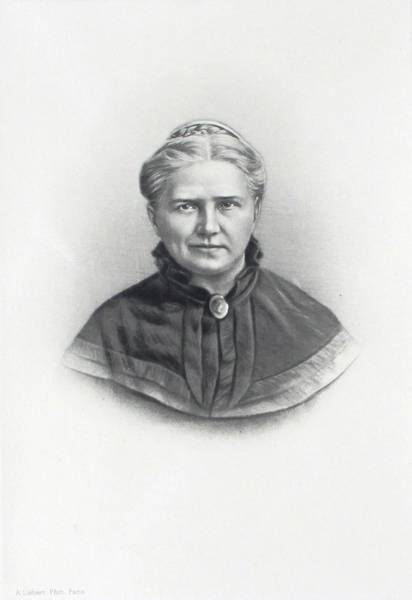
- Born: Caroline Julie Émilie Velten; November 15, 1833; Wissembourg, France
- Died: c. 1896 (aged 62–63)
- Spouse: Jules Favre

Julie Velten Favre (November 15, 1833 – c. 1896), sometimes called Madame Jules Favre, was a French philosopher and educator. She is known for her work educating young women and for advancing a moral philosophy that advocated living a virtuous life, rather than one based on rules and punishment.

== Life ==
Favre was born Caroline Julie Émilie Velten in Wissembourg in the north-eastern part of France to Michel Velten and Caroline Louise Weber. Her father was a Lutheran minister. As a child she disagreed with the imposition of religious practices and was greatly affected by the French Revolution of 1848, when she was fourteen years old. Velten grew to believe strongly in freedom and self-determination. Favre was the grandmother of the Existential Thomist philosopher and theologian Jacques Maritain, through her daughter Geneviève.

== Professional life ==
Not long after completing her teaching degree in Wissembourg, Velten became head assistant of a boarding school in Paris. Run by a Mme. Frèrejean, this Protestant school emphasized the personal will and good mental habits over strict punishment or rigid oversight. Velten was highly influenced by this educational approach. After Frèrejean's death in 1860, Velten became director of the school.

In 1870, the Franco-Prussian War broke out and northeastern France was occupied by German forces. Velten stayed at the school with students who were unable to leave.

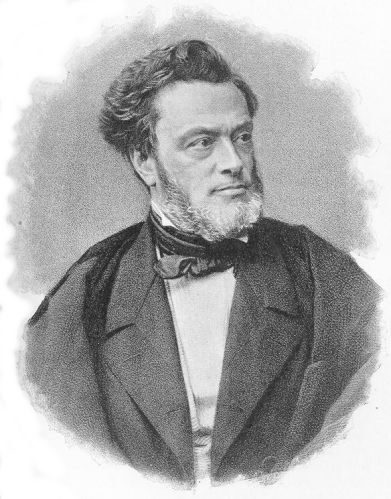
Portrait of Jules Favre.

Velten married Jules Favre, a public official who was active in the French Third Republic, in 1871. The couple traveled often, and Velten Favre used this time to translate various German and Swiss books into French. She also was an intellectual equal of her husband and contributed to his works. In the preface of one of his books, he said of her, "Her name ought to be beside mine on all the works to which over the last four years she has so faithfully contributed and for which I found, in her mind and heart, the surest guide."

Jules Favre died in January 1880, and in the following years she compiled, edited and completed his works into several volumes. In 1883 she wrote a defense of her husband's career, which some at the time viewed in a negative light.

In 1881, Jules Ferry, the French Minister of National Education, named Velten Favre director of the Ècole Normale Supérieure de Sèvres. Ferry was a champion of secular public education, and Velten Favre was well suited to lead the movement for French women to receive secondary education, despite a skeptical public. Velten Favre continued to teach at the school until she died in 1896.

== Philosophy ==
As an educator, Velten Favre frequently pulled excerpts from classical and modern philosophers such as Aristotle, the Stoics, Plato, Socrates, Molière and Ralph Waldo Emerson for her students to read and discuss. Her own works grew from this educational background and were mainly written in the 1880s. She believed in universal morality, encouraging her students to live educated, moral lives. Personally she considered moral law to have foundations in the Christian perspective, but she also wrote that moral truth could be found outside of Christianity.

In particular, Velten Favre wrote that one is first a moral citizen, and only secondarily is a member of a country or family. This places men and women as equals. Velten Favre believed that women had a particular vocation to teach morality, which necessitates that women receive a broad and complete education.

== Works ==
=== Philosophical works ===
- 1887 - Montaigne moraliste et pédagogue
- 1888 - La Morale des Stoïciens
- 1888 - La Morale de Socrate
- 1889 - La Morale d'Aristote
- 1891 - La Morale de Cicéron
- 1909 - La Morale de Plutarque

=== Compilation works and defenses of Jules Favre ===
- 1881 - Editor, Discours parlementaires (by Jules Favre)
- 1882 - Editor, Plaidoyers politiques et judiciaires (by Jules Favre)
- 1883 - La Vérité sur les désastres de l'armée de l'Est et sur le désarmement de la garde nationale, telle qu'elle ressort des dépêches officielles échangées entre le gouvernement de Bordeaux et les chefs de l'armée, et des dépositions des principaux témoins devant la commission d'enquête parlementaire
- 1893 - Editor, Plaidoyers et discours du bâtonnat (by Jules Favre)
