= Magnetocaloric effect =

Change in temperature due to a magnetic field

Gadolinium alloy heats up inside the magnetic field and loses thermal energy to the environment, so it exits the field and becomes cooler than when it entered.

The magnetocaloric effect (MCE, from magnet and calorie) is a phenomenon in which certain materials warm up when a magnetic field is applied. The warming is due to changes in the internal state of the material, which releases heat. When the magnetic field is removed, the material returns to its original state, reabsorbing the heat, and returning to original temperature. This can be used to achieve refrigeration, by allowing the material to radiate away its heat while in the magnetized hot state. Removing the magnetism, the material then cools to below its original temperature.

The effect was first observed in 1881 by German physicist Emil Warburg, followed by French and Swiss physicists Pierre Weiss and Auguste Piccard in 1917. The fundamental principle was suggested by American chemists Peter Debye (1926) and William Giauque (1927). The first working magnetic refrigerators were constructed by several groups beginning in 1933. Magnetic refrigeration was the first method developed for cooling below about 0.3 K (the lowest temperature attainable before magnetic refrigeration, by pumping on ^{3}He vapors).

The magnetocaloric effect can be used to attain extremely low temperatures, as well as the ranges used in common refrigerators.

== History ==
The effect was first observed by German physicist Emil Warburg in 1881 Subsequently by French physicist Pierre Weiss and Swiss physicist Auguste Piccard in 1917.

Major advances first appeared in the late 1920s when cooling via adiabatic demagnetization was independently proposed by chemistry Nobel Laureates Peter Debye in 1926 and William F. Giauque in 1927.

It was first demonstrated experimentally by Giauque and his colleague D. P. MacDougall in 1933 for cryogenic purposes when they reached 0.25 K. Between 1933 and 1997, advances in MCE cooling occurred.

In 1997, the first near room-temperature proof of concept magnetic refrigerator was demonstrated by Karl A. Gschneidner, Jr. by the Iowa State University at Ames Laboratory. This event attracted interest from scientists and companies worldwide who started developing new kinds of room temperature materials and magnetic refrigerator designs.

A major breakthrough came 2002 when a group at the University of Amsterdam demonstrated the giant magnetocaloric effect in MnFe(P,As) alloys that are based on abundant materials.

Refrigerators based on the magnetocaloric effect have been demonstrated in laboratories, using magnetic fields starting at 0.6 T up to 10 T. Magnetic fields above 2 T are difficult to produce with permanent magnets and are produced by a superconducting magnet (1 T is about 20000 times the Earth's magnetic field).

=== Room temperature devices ===
Recent research has focused on near room temperature. Constructed examples of room temperature magnetic refrigerators include:

Room temperature magnetic refrigerators
Sponsor	Location	Announcement date	Type	Max. cooling power (W)^{[1]}	Max ΔT (K)^{[2]}	Magnetic field (T)	Solid refrigerant	Quantity (kg)	COP (-)^{[3]}
Ames Laboratory/Astronautics	Ames, Iowa/Madison, Wisconsin, US	February 20, 1997	Reciprocating	600	10	5 (S)	Gd spheres		
Mater. Science Institute Barcelona	Barcelona, Spain	May 2000	Rotary	?	5	0.95 (P)	Gd foil		
Chubu Electric/Toshiba	Yokohama, Japan	Summer 2000	Reciprocating	100	21	4 (S)	Gd spheres		
University of Victoria	Victoria, British Columbia Canada	July 2001	Reciprocating	2	14	2 (S)	Gd & Gd_{1−x}Tb_{x} L.B.		
Astronautics	Madison, Wisconsin, US	September 18, 2001	Rotary	95	25	1.5 (P)	Gd spheres		
Sichuan Inst. Tech./Nanjing University	Nanjing, China	23 April 2002	Reciprocating	?	23	1.4 (P)	Gd spheres and Gd_{5}Si_{1.985}Ge_{1.985}Ga_{0.03} powder		
Chubu Electric/Toshiba	Yokohama, Japan	October 5, 2002	Reciprocating	40	27	0.6 (P)	Gd_{1−x}Dy_{x} L.B.		
Chubu Electric/Toshiba	Yokohama, Japan	March 4, 2003	Rotary	60	10	0.76 (P)	Gd_{1−x}Dy_{x} L.B.	1	
Lab. d'Electrotechnique Grenoble	Grenoble, France	April 2003	Reciprocating	8.8	4	0.8 (P)	Gd foil		
George Washington University	US	July 2004	Reciprocating	?	5	2 (P)	Gd foil		
Astronautics	Madison, Wisconsin, US	2004	Rotary	95	25	1.5 (P)	Gd and GdEr spheres / La(Fe_{0.88}Si^{130−}_{0.12}H_{1.0}		
University of Victoria	Victoria, British Columbia Canada	2006	Reciprocating	15	50	2 (S)	Gd, Gd_{0.74}Tb_{0.26} and Gd_{0.85}Er_{0.15} pucks	0.12	
University of Salerno	Salerno, Italy	2016	Rotary	250	12	1.2 (P)	Gd 0.600 mm spherical particles	1.20	0.5 - 2.5
MISiS	Tver and Moscow, Russia	2019	High speed rotary	?	?	?	Gd bricks of two types, cascaded		
^{1}maximum cooling power at zero temperature difference (ΔT=0); ^{2}maximum temperature span at zero cooling capacity (W=0); L.B. = layered bed; P = permanent magnet; S = superconducting magnet; ^{3} COP values under different operating conditions

In one example, Prof. Karl A. Gschneidner, Jr. unveiled a proof of concept magnetic refrigerator near room temperature on February 20, 1997. He also announced the discovery of the GMCE in Gd_{5}Si_{2}Ge_{2} on June 9, 1997. Since then, hundreds of peer-reviewed articles have been written describing materials exhibiting magnetocaloric effects.

== Process ==
The MCE is a magneto-thermodynamic phenomenon in which a temperature change of a suitable material is caused by exposing the material to a changing magnetic field. This is also known by low temperature physicists as adiabatic demagnetization. In that part of the refrigeration process, a decrease in the strength of an externally applied magnetic field allows the magnetic domains of a magnetocaloric material to become disoriented from the magnetic field by the agitating action of the thermal energy (phonons) present in the material. If the material is isolated so that no energy is allowed to (re)migrate into the material during this time, (i.e., an adiabatic process) the temperature drops as the domains absorb the thermal energy to perform their reorientation. The randomization of the domains occurs in a similar fashion to the randomization at the Curie temperature of a ferromagnetic material, except that magnetic dipoles overcome a decreasing external magnetic field while energy remains constant, instead of magnetic domains being disrupted from internal ferromagnetism as energy is added.

One of the most notable examples of the magnetocaloric effect is in the chemical element gadolinium and some of its alloys. Gadolinium's temperature increases when it enters certain magnetic fields. When it leaves the magnetic field, the temperature drops. The effect is considerably stronger for the gadolinium alloy Gd_{5}(Si_{2}Ge_{2}). Praseodymium alloyed with nickel (PrNi_{5}) has such a strong magnetocaloric effect that it has allowed scientists to approach to within one millikelvin, one thousandth of a degree of absolute zero.

=== Equation ===
The magnetocaloric effect can be quantified with the following equation:

$$\Delta T_\mathrm{ad} = -\int\limits_{H_0}^{H_1} \left(\frac {T}{C(T,H)}\right)_{\!\!H} {\left(\frac {\partial M(T,H)}{\partial T}\right)}_{\!\!H} dH$$

where ΔT_{ad} is the adiabatic change in temperature of the magnetic system around temperature T; H is the applied external magnetic field; C is the heat capacity of the working magnet (refrigerant); and M is the magnetization of the refrigerant.

From the equation we can see that the magnetocaloric effect can be enhanced by:

- a large field variation
- a magnet material with a small heat capacity
- a magnet with large changes in net magnetization vs. temperature, at constant magnetic field

The adiabatic change in temperature ΔT_{ad} can be seen to be related to the magnet's change in magnetic entropy (ΔS) since

$$\Delta S(T) = \int\limits_{H_0}^{H_1}\left(\frac{\partial M(T,H')}{\partial T} \right)dH'$$

This implies that the absolute change in the magnet's entropy determines the possible magnitude of the adiabatic temperature change under a thermodynamic cycle of magnetic field variation.

=== Thermodynamic cycle ===
Analogy between magnetic refrigeration and vapor cycle or conventional refrigeration. H is the externally applied magnetic field; Q is the heat quantity; P is the pressure; ΔT_{ad} is the adiabatic temperature variation.

The cycle is performed as a refrigeration cycle that is analogous to the Carnot refrigeration cycle, but with increases and decreases in magnetic field strength instead of increases and decreases in pressure. It can be described at a starting point whereby the chosen working substance is introduced into a magnetic field, i.e., the magnetic flux density is increased. The working material is the refrigerant, and starts in thermal equilibrium with the refrigerated environment.

- Adiabatic magnetization: A magnetocaloric substance is placed in an insulated environment. The increasing external magnetic field (+H) causes the magnetic dipoles of the atoms to align, thereby decreasing the material's magnetic entropy and heat capacity. Since overall energy is not lost (yet) and therefore total entropy is not reduced (according to thermodynamic laws), the net result is that the substance is heated (T + ΔT_{ad}).
- Isomagnetic enthalpic transfer: This added heat can then be removed (–Q) by a fluid or gas — gaseous or liquid helium, for example. The magnetic field is held constant to prevent the dipoles from reabsorbing the heat. Once sufficiently cooled, the magnetocaloric substance and the coolant are separated (H = 0).
- Adiabatic demagnetization: The substance is returned to another adiabatic (insulated) condition so the total entropy remains constant. However, this time the magnetic field is decreased, the thermal energy causes the magnetic moments to overcome the field, and thus the sample cools, i.e., an adiabatic temperature change. Energy (and entropy) transfers from thermal entropy to magnetic entropy, measuring the disorder of the magnetic dipoles.
- Isomagnetic entropic transfer: The magnetic field is held constant to prevent the material from reheating. The material is placed in thermal contact with the environment to be refrigerated. Because the working material is cooler than the refrigerated environment (by design), heat energy migrates into the working material (+Q).

Once the refrigerant and refrigerated environment are in thermal equilibrium, the cycle can restart.

=== Applied technique ===
The basic operating principle of an adiabatic demagnetization refrigerator (ADR) is the use of a strong magnetic field to control the entropy of a sample of material, often called the "refrigerant". Magnetic field constrains the orientation of magnetic dipoles in the refrigerant. The stronger the magnetic field, the more aligned the dipoles are, corresponding to lower entropy and heat capacity because the material has (effectively) lost some of its internal degrees of freedom. If the refrigerant is kept at a constant temperature through thermal contact with a heat sink (usually liquid helium) while the magnetic field is switched on, the refrigerant must lose some energy because it is equilibrated with the heat sink. When the magnetic field is subsequently switched off, the heat capacity of the refrigerant rises again because the degrees of freedom associated with orientation of the dipoles are once again liberated, pulling their share of equipartitioned energy from the motion of the molecules, thereby lowering the overall temperature of a system with decreased energy. Since the system is now insulated when the magnetic field is switched off, the process is adiabatic, i.e., the system can no longer exchange energy with its surroundings (the heat sink), and its temperature decreases below its initial value, that of the heat sink.

The operation of a standard ADR proceeds roughly as follows. First, a strong magnetic field is applied to the refrigerant, forcing its various magnetic dipoles to align and putting these degrees of freedom of the refrigerant into a state of lowered entropy. The heat sink then absorbs the heat released by the refrigerant due to its loss of entropy. Thermal contact with the heat sink is then broken so that the system is insulated, and the magnetic field is switched off, increasing the heat capacity of the refrigerant, thus decreasing its temperature below the temperature of the heat sink. In practice, the magnetic field is decreased slowly in order to provide continuous cooling and keep the sample at an approximately constant low temperature. Once the field falls to zero or to some low limiting value determined by the properties of the refrigerant, the cooling power of the ADR vanishes, and heat leaks will cause the refrigerant to warm up.

== Working materials ==
The MCE is an intrinsic property of a magnetic solid. This thermal response of a solid to the application or removal of magnetic fields is maximized when the solid is near its magnetic ordering temperature. Thus, the materials considered for magnetic refrigeration devices should be magnetic materials with a magnetic phase transition temperature near the temperature region of interest. For refrigerators that could be used in the home, this temperature is room temperature. The temperature change can be further increased when the order-parameter of the phase transition changes strongly within the temperature range of interest.

The magnitudes of the magnetic entropy and the adiabatic temperature changes are strongly dependent upon the magnetic ordering process. The magnitude is generally small in antiferromagnets, ferrimagnets and spin glass systems but can be much larger for ferromagnets that undergo a magnetic phase transition. First order phase transitions are characterized by a discontinuity in the magnetization changes with temperature, resulting in a latent heat. Second order phase transitions do not have this latent heat associated with the phase transition.

In the late 1990s Pecharksy and Gschneidner reported a magnetic entropy change in Gd_{5}(Si_{2}Ge_{2}) that was about 50% larger than that reported for Gd metal, which had the largest known magnetic entropy change at the time. This giant magnetocaloric effect (GMCE) occurred at 270 K, which is lower than that of Gd (294 K). Since the MCE occurs below room temperature these materials would not be suitable for refrigerators operating at room temperature. Since then other alloys have also demonstrated the giant magnetocaloric effect. These include Gd_{5}(Si_{x}Ge_{1−x})_{4}, La(Fe_{x}Si_{1−x})_{13}H_{x} and MnFeP_{1−x}As_{x} alloys. Gadolinium and its alloys undergo second-order phase transitions that have no magnetic or thermal hysteresis. However, the use of rare earth elements makes these materials very expensive.

Ni_{2}Mn-X (X = Ga, Co, In, Al, Sb) Heusler alloys are also promising candidates for magnetic cooling applications because they have Curie temperatures near room temperature and, depending on composition, can have martensitic phase transformations near room temperature. These materials exhibit the magnetic shape memory effect and can also be used as actuators, energy harvesting devices, and sensors. When the martensitic transformation temperature and the Curie temperature are the same (based on composition) the magnitude of the magnetic entropy change is the largest. In February 2014, GE announced the development of a functional Ni-Mn-based magnetic refrigerator.

The development of this technology is very material-dependent and will likely not replace vapor-compression refrigeration without significantly improved materials that are cheap, abundant, and exhibit much larger magnetocaloric effects over a larger range of temperatures. Such materials need to show significant temperature changes under a field of two tesla or less, so that permanent magnets can be used for the production of the magnetic field.

=== Paramagnetic salts ===
The original proposed refrigerant was a paramagnetic salt, such as cerium magnesium nitrate. The active magnetic dipoles in this case are those of the electron shells of the paramagnetic atoms.

In a paramagnetic salt ADR, the heat sink is usually provided by a pumped ^{4}He (about 1.2 K) or ^{3}He (about 0.3 K) cryostat. An easily attainable 1 T magnetic field is generally required for initial magnetization. The minimum temperature attainable is determined by the self-magnetization tendencies of the refrigerant salt, but temperatures from 1 to 100 mK are accessible. Dilution refrigerators had for many years supplanted paramagnetic salt ADRs, but interest in space-based and simple to use lab-ADRs has remained, due to the complexity and unreliability of the dilution refrigerator.

At a low enough temperature, paramagnetic salts become either diamagnetic or ferromagnetic, limiting the lowest temperature that can be reached using this method.

=== Nuclear demagnetization ===
One variant of adiabatic demagnetization that continues to find substantial research application is nuclear demagnetization refrigeration (NDR). NDR follows the same principles, but in this case the cooling power arises from the magnetic dipoles of the nuclei of the refrigerant atoms, rather than their electron configurations. Since these dipoles are of much smaller magnitude, they are less prone to self-alignment and have lower intrinsic minimum fields. This allows NDR to cool the nuclear spin system to very low temperatures, often 1 μK or below. Unfortunately, the small magnitudes of nuclear magnetic dipoles also makes them less inclined to align to external fields. Magnetic fields of 3 teslas or greater are often needed for the initial magnetization step of NDR.

In NDR systems, the initial heat sink must sit at very low temperatures (10–100 mK). This precooling is often provided by the mixing chamber of a dilution refrigerator or a paramagnetic salt.

== Commercial development ==
Research and a demonstration proof of concept device in 2001 succeeded in applying commercial-grade materials and permanent magnets at room temperatures to construct a magnetocaloric refrigerator.

On August 20, 2007, the Risø National Laboratory (Denmark) at the Technical University of Denmark, claimed to have reached a milestone in their magnetic cooling research when they reported a temperature span of 8.7 K. They hoped to introduce the first commercial applications of the technology by 2010.

As of 2013 this technology had proven commercially viable only for ultra-low temperature cryogenic applications available for decades. Magnetocaloric refrigeration systems are composed of pumps, motors, secondary fluids, heat exchangers of different types, magnets and magnetic materials. These processes are greatly affected by irreversibilities and should be adequately considered. At year-end, Cooltech Applications announced that its first commercial refrigeration equipment would enter the market in 2014. Cooltech Applications launched their first commercially available magnetic refrigeration system on 20 June 2016. At the 2015 Consumer Electronics Show in Las Vegas, a consortium of Haier, Astronautics Corporation of America and BASF presented the first cooling appliance. BASF claim of their technology a 35% improvement over using compressors.

In November 2015, at the Medica 2015 fair, Cooltech Applications presented, in collaboration with Kirsch medical GmbH, the world's first magnetocaloric medical cabinet. One year later, in September 2016, at the 7th International Conference on Magnetic Refrigeration at Room Temperature (Thermag VII)] held in Torino, Italy, Cooltech Applications presented the world's first magnetocaloric frozen heat exchanger.

In 2017, Cooltech Applications presented a fully functional 500 liters' magnetocaloric cooled cabinet with a 30 kg (66 lb) load and an air temperature inside the cabinet of +2 °C. That proved that magnetic refrigeration is a mature technology, capable of replacing the classic refrigeration solutions.

One year later, in September 2018, at the 8th International Conference on Magnetic Refrigeration at Room Temperature (Thermag VIII]), Cooltech Applications presented a paper on a magnetocaloric prototype designed as a 15 kW proof-of-concept unit. This has been considered by the community as the largest magnetocaloric prototype ever created.

At the same conference, Dr. Sergiu Lionte announced that, due to financial issues, Cooltech Applications declared bankruptcy. Later on, in 2019 Ubiblue company, today named Magnoric, is formed by some of the old Cooltech Application's team members. The entire patent portfolio form Cooltech Applications was taken over by Magnoric since then, while publishing additional patents at the same time.

In 2019, at the 5th Delft Days Conference on Magnetocalorics, Dr. Sergiu Lionte presented Ubiblue's (former Cooltech Application) last prototype. Later, the magnetocaloric community acknowledged that Ubiblue had the most developed magnetocalorics prototypes.

Thermal and magnetic hysteresis problems remain to be solved for first-order phase transition materials that exhibit the GMCE.

Vapor-compression refrigeration units typically achieve performance coefficients of 60% of that of a theoretical ideal Carnot cycle, much higher than current magnetic refrigeration technology. Small domestic refrigerators are however much less efficient.

In 2014 giant anisotropic behavior of the magnetocaloric effect was found in HoMn_{2}O_{5} at 10 K. The anisotropy of the magnetic entropy change gives rise to a large rotating MCE offering the possibility to build simplified, compact, and efficient magnetic cooling systems by rotating it in a constant magnetic field.

In 2015 Aprea et al. presented a new refrigeration concept, GeoThermag, which is a combination of magnetic refrigeration technology with that of low-temperature geothermal energy. To demonstrate the applicability of the GeoThermag technology, they developed a pilot system that consists of a 100-m deep geothermal probe; inside the probe, water flows and is used directly as a regenerating fluid for a magnetic refrigerator operating with gadolinium. The GeoThermag system showed the ability to produce cold water even at 281.8 K in the presence of a heat load of 60 W. In addition, the system has shown the existence of an optimal frequency f AMR, 0.26 Hz, for which it was possible to produce cold water at 287.9 K with a thermal load equal to 190 W with a COP of 2.20. Observing the temperature of the cold water that was obtained in the tests, the GeoThermag system showed a good ability to feed the cooling radiant floors and a reduced capacity for feeding the fan coil systems.

== See also ==
- Coefficient of performance – Ratio of useful heating or cooling provided to work required
- Cryostat – Cooling device
- Curie's law – Relation of magnetization to applied magnetic field and temperature
- Dilution refrigerator – Cryogenic device for cooling to very low temperatures
- Elastocaloric effect – Class of materials
- Electrocaloric effect – Temperature change of a material under an electric field
- Thermoacoustic refrigeration – Heat pump powered by sound
