= Electrocaloric effect =

Temperature change of a material under an electric field

The electrocaloric effect is a phenomenon in which a material shows a reversible temperature change under an applied electric field.

== Introduction ==
The electrocaloric effect (ECE) is a phenomenon observed in dielectric materials, where a reversible temperature/entropy change occurs due to the alignment and reordering of dipoles under an applied electric field. When an electric field is applied, the dipoles within the dielectric material align, leading to a decrease in dipolar entropy and the release of heat, resulting in a temperature rise. Conversely, when the electric field is removed, the dipoles return to a more disordered state, causing the material to absorb heat from its surroundings, resulting in a temperature decrease. This effect is being explored for use in solid-state cooling applications, particularly in areas where traditional cooling methods may be less efficient or impractical, such as in portable devices, microelectronics, and distributed thermal management.

The electrocaloric effect is often considered to be the physical inverse of the pyroelectric effect. The electrocaloric effect should not be confused with the Thermoelectric effect (specifically, the Peltier effect), in which a temperature difference occurs when a current is driven through an electric junction with two dissimilar conductors.

== Historical Background ==
Before 2006, the electrocaloric effect (ECE) observed was relatively small, typically producing a temperature change of about 2.5 K at temperatures above 200 °C, and about 2 K at room temperature. Lead scandium tantalate (PST) was studied in 1989, and exhibited a temperature change of 2.5 K.

=== Breakthrough Discoveries ===
In 2006, researchers discovered a giant electrocaloric effect in 350 nm thin-film PbZr_{0}._{95}Ti_{0}._{05}O_{3} (PZT), generating a notable 12 K temperature change near 220 °C. The device structure consisted of a thin film (PZT) on top of a much thicker substrate, but the figure of 12 K represents the cooling of the thin film only. The net cooling of such a device would be lower than 12 K due to the heat capacity of the substrate to which it is attached. This effect, particularly strong near phase transitions like the Curie temperature, far exceeded previous results in bulk materials. The study highlighted thin films' potential for solid-state cooling and suggested further material improvements could enhance practical applications.

In 2008, researchers discovered a giant electrocaloric effect in ferroelectric polymers near room temperature. The poly(vinylidene fluoride-trifluoroethylene) copolymer [P(VDF-TrFE)] exhibited an adiabatic temperature change of over 12 °C and an entropy change exceeding 55 J/kgK near the ferroelectric-paraelectric transition at ~70 °C. Incorporating chlorofluoroethylene (CFE) into the copolymer achieved the giant ECE at room temperature for the first time, and demonstrated the potential to apply the ECE in cooling applications of daily life. The electrocaloric P(VDF-TrFE-CFE) terpolymers have been commercialized and are available from Arkema. The large ECE of the commercial EC polymers has enabled world-wide R&D efforts in EC cooling technologies.

=== Recent Developments ===
A 2019 study demonstrated significant electrocaloric effects in multilayer capacitors (MLCs) of lead scandium tantalate (PST) ceramics. These materials achieved temperature changes of up to 5.5 K near room temperature. The research highlights PST MLCs' potential for efficient and compact cooling applications, offering an alternative to magnetocaloric systems.

For EC cooling devices, the applied electric fields to the EC materials in the devices should be much lower than the dielectric breakdown field for reliable EC device operation while generating a high ECE. In general, the applied field should be less than 25% of the dielectric breakdown. To address this challenge, in 2021, researchers developed a high-entropy polymer that achieved an EC temperature change of 7.5 K temperature change under a low electric field of 50 MV/m. By modifying a P(VDF-TrFE-CFE) terpolymer with double bonds, they enhanced dipolar entropy and reduced the energy barrier for phase transitions. This class of polymers also demonstrated excellent durability, maintaining performance over one million cycles.

In 2023, researchers developed a new ferroelectric polymer with subnanometer-scale pores, created by introducing and evaporating dimethylhexynediol (DMHD). This process significantly enhanced the electrocaloric effect (ECE), achieving a temperature change of over 20 K under a low electric field. The study highlights the potential of interfacial engineering in electrocaloric materials, offering promising applications in energy-efficient, solid-state cooling.

== Electrocaloric Cooling Device Studies ==
Electrocaloric (EC) devices use the electrocaloric effect, where an electric field causes a reversible temperature change in a material. EC cooling cycles, similar to traditional refrigeration but without harmful refrigerants, involve heating and cooling phases driven by electric fields. These cycles are energy-efficient and environmentally friendly, making EC devices ideal for portable, localized, and distributed cooling.

The EC effect involves a temperature change in a dielectric material when an electric field is applied or removed, making it suitable for compact cooling solutions. In 2013, a chip-scale solid-state cooling system utilizing EC polymer films was demonstrated, achieving a 6 K temperature span near room temperature through a prototype EC Oscillatory Refrigeration (ECOR) device.

In 2015, a small-scale electrocaloric (EC) cooling device was developed using bulk relaxor ferroelectric ceramics, specifically [Pb(Mg_{1/3}Nb_{2/3})O_{3}]_{0.9}[PbTiO_{3}]_{0.1} (PMN-10PT), as the active material in an active electrocaloric regenerator (AER). The device achieved a significant temperature span across the regenerator by employing a fluid flow system and a controlled electric field. Experimental results demonstrated a temperature span of up to 3.3 K under an applied electric field of 50 kV/cm. Moreover, simulations indicated that with design optimizations—such as using deionized water as the regenerator fluid and extending the regenerator length—a temperature span of up to 14 K could potentially be achieved.

Most caloric cooling devices rely on regenerative cycles to achieve a larger temperature span than the adiabatic temperature change of the caloric materials. However, the use of external regenerators can reduce the overall efficiency of these devices. In 2017, researchers demonstrated a regenerative electrocaloric cooling device that operates without external regenerators. The device employed commercial multilayer ceramic elements. Under an electric field of 16.6 MV/m, these elements achieved a temperature span of 0.9 K.

Same year in 2017 researchers designed a compact and flexible electrocaloric cooling device by integrating an EC polymer film with electrostatic actuation. This device demonstrated a coefficient of performance (COP) of 13 and a specific cooling power of 2.8 W/g. The study underscores the potential of EC cooling technologies for compact, efficient cooling applications, particularly in wearable and portable devices.

In 2018, researchers at United Technologies Research Center (UTRC) demonstrated the direct-air electrocaloric heat pump, exploiting the innovations of direct air cooling using EC polymer films and device engineering which significantly enhanced the cooling efficiency and performance of EC devices.

In 2020, researchers demonstrated an active EC regenerator, with the innovation involved a parallel-plate design using lead scandium tantalate (PST) multilayer capacitors, optimized through finite element modeling to enhance insulation and heat transfer. The prototype achieved a temperature span of 13 K, demonstrating the potential of EC materials for high-efficiency cooling applications.

A study in 2020 on electrocaloric devices made significant strides in advancing the design and performance of all-solid-state cooling systems. The research introduced a scalable, high-performance EC cooling system based on multilayer ceramic PST capacitors (MLCCs). By leveraging a modular, self-regenerating architecture and enhancing both material properties and device engineering, the system achieved a temperature span of 5.2 °C and a maximum heat flux of 135 mW/cm^{2}.

A significant advancement in 2020 is the development of a cascade electrocaloric device, which increases the temperature span by integrating multiple EC polymer elements that operate in synergy. This device achieved temperature span of 8.7 K under no-load conditions. The device also achieves a coefficient of performance (COP) of 9.0 at a temperature lift of 2.7 K, and 10.4 at zero temperature lift.

In 2023, researchers developed an EC device using PST multilayer capacitors that achieved a maximum temperature span of 20.9 K under no-load conditions and a cooling power of 4.2 W under a moderate electric field. With a coefficient of performance (COP) reaching up to 64% of Carnot's efficiency when energy recovery was considered, this design marks a significant step toward making EC technology a viable alternative to traditional vapor compression cooling systems.

By integrating flexible organic photovoltaic modules with EC polymer modules, a study in 2023 demonstrated an efficient and self-sustaining wearable system capable of regulating body temperature using only sunlight. The EC devices, based on the EC polymer P(VDF-TrFE-CFE), offer high efficiency, low energy consumption, and bidirectional thermoregulation, making them suitable for wearable applications. These innovations pave the way for practical, all-day thermoregulatory solutions in challenging environments, such as polar regions or space travel.

In 2023 and 2024, researchers developed self-oscillating polymeric refrigerators that combine the electrocaloric and electrostrictive effects. These devices, which are accessory-free, demonstrate a high cooling power density of over 6.5 W/g and a peak coefficient of performance (COP) exceeding 58. These advances highlight the potential of EC technology to provide efficient, localized thermal management solutions without the need for external actuators.

== See also ==
- Elastocaloric effect
- Magnetocaloric effect
