= Eugénie Cotton =

French scientist and women's rights activist (1881–1967)

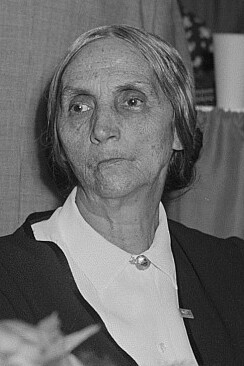
- Born: Eugénie Elise Céline Feytis; 13 October 1881; Soubise, France
- Died: 16 June 1967 (aged 85); Sèvres, France
- Education: Sorbonne University (PhD)
- Political party: French Communist Party
- Board member of: Women in Solidarity World Peace Council
- Spouse: Aimé Cotton (m. 1913–1951)
- Awards: Knight of the Legion of Honor; Gold medal from the World Peace Council; Stalin Peace Prize
- Scientific career
- Fields: Magnetism
- Workplaces: CNRS
- Thesis: Recherche sur les sels paramagnétiques (1925)

Eugénie Cotton, née Feytis (French: [øʒeni kɔtɔ̃]; 13 October 1881 – 16 June 1967), was a French physicist, socialist and educator who was active in the French Resistance during World War II. She headed the École normale superieure de jeunes filles à Sèvres from 1936 and was a founding member and president of both the French Women's Union and the Women's International Democratic Federation in the 1940s. For her peace and women's rights advocacy, she was awarded the Stalin Peace Prize in 1951. She was also honoured as a Knight of the Legion of Honour in 1934, and received the Gold Medal of the World Peace Council in 1961.

== Life and career ==
=== Early life, family and education ===
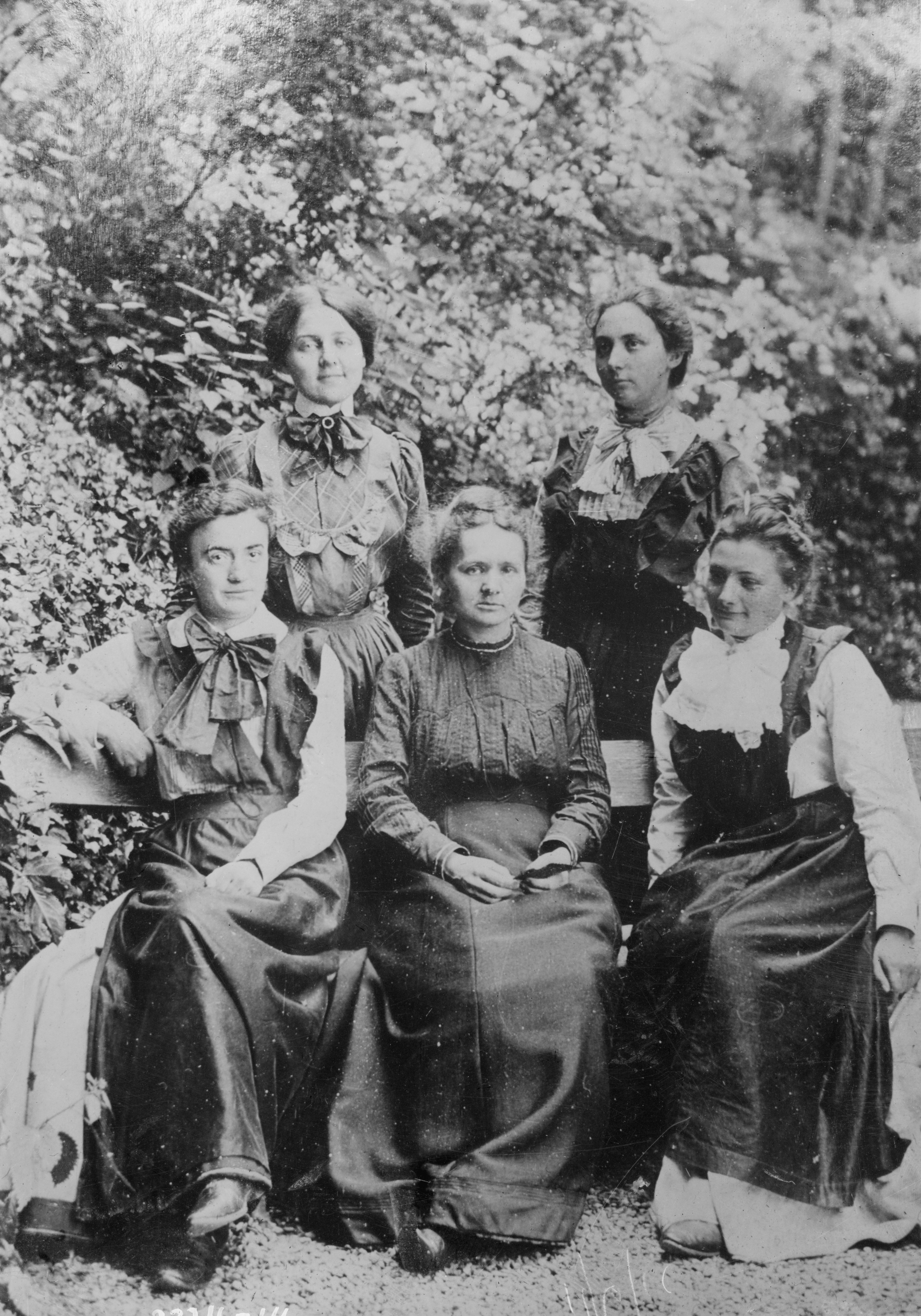
Marie Curie (centre) surrounded by 4 students Back l-r Madeleine and Eugénie Cotton. Front l-r Anna Cartan and Marthe Baillaud.

Eugénie Elise Céline Feytis was born in Soubise (Charente-Maritime) on 13 October 1881, the second daughter in a family of shopkeepers. Her parents were supportive of their children's education. Her older sister Amélie died of typhoid while attending at the teacher-training college in La Rochelle. Eugénie won a scholarship to the lycée in Niort and earned the baccalauréat lettres-mathématiques in 1900.

She enrolled at the École normale supérieure de jeunes filles (ENSJF) in Sèvres in 1901 where she was one of four female students on the science course. She became a pupil of Marie Curie, and met Pierre Curie and Paul Langevin, with whom she studied until 1903. During this time Pierre Curie taught her to ride a bicycle whilst inspiring her future research into crystals and magnetism. She later babysat the young Irène Joliot-Curie.

In 1904, she was first in the female competition of the agrégation of physical and natural sciences. After graduation, she taught at a collège (middle school) in Poitiers and then at the ENSJF from 1905.

She began her research in 1908 at the Sorbonne’s Physical Chemistry Laboratory and presented a paper to the French Physical Society on the paramagnetism of metal salts. Pierre Weiss, who was interested in this topic, invited her in 1912 to the Zurich Polytechnic, an offer she accepted after securing a one-year leave of absence from the ENSJF and a scholarship. She learned a great deal there and contributed research that helped Weiss develop his magneton theory. In Zurich, she became part of the social circle of Pierre and Jeanne Weiss, even attending gatherings where Albert Einstein played the violin. In 1913, she married fellow physicist Aimé Cotton, a professor at the Faculty of Science in Paris and at the École normale supérieure in Saint-Cloud. She was his second wife and inherited three step children. They had four children (one of whom died shortly after birth).

Due to World War I and family responsibilities, she paused her doctoral work until the age of 44. She joined the Association française des femmes diplômées des universités as soon as it was founded in 1920, and resumed her work to complete her dissertation, which she successfully defended in Strasbourg, thereby earning a doctorate in physical sciences in 1925. She chose to defend her doctoral thesis in the University of Strasbourg in 1925, instead of the Sorbonne University. Jean Perrin was part of the jury.

=== Research ===
Eugénie Cotton later became a senior research fellow at the National Center for Scientific Research (CNRS), the largest French public body of scientific research. She also became director (headmistress) of the ENSJF in 1936, and was the first doctor of science to undertake that role. She played a significant role in the reform of women's studies at the ENSJF, raising the level of science education and developing the on-site laboratory which in turn led to improvements in research.

=== Wartime activities ===
A member of the French Communist Party, Cotton helped the German anti-fascists who had taken refuge in France after 1933, and went on to support insurgents fleeing Franco after fighting fascism in Spain.

During World War II, the French national Vichy government that supported the German occupation of France, mandated that Cotton leave her post at the ENSJF by forced retirement in 1941. This was done under the Law of 11 October 1940, requiring women over the age of 50 to retire. She was replaced in the role by Edmée Hatinguais. During the course of the war, her husband was arrested twice by the Gestapo but survived the experience.

In 1944, Cotton participated in the founding of the Union des femmes françaises (UFF) (Union of French Women) and was president at the time of the organisation's first Congress in 1945. She was a founding member in 1945 and the first president of the Women's International Democratic Federation.

=== After the war ===
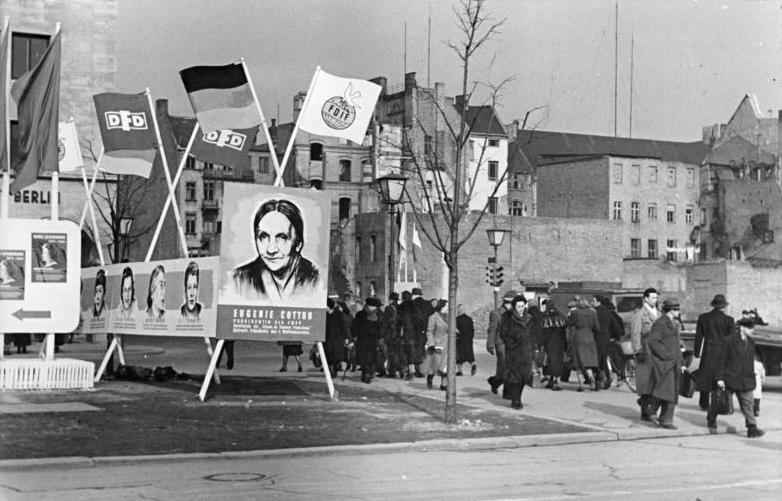
Cotton's image was part of an International Women's Day street display in March 1951 on Unter den Linden in Berlin.

Eugénie Cotton wrote a book about the Curie family in 1963 and a biography of her husband Aimé Cotton in 1967. She also started a manuscript of her own autobiography but it was never completed.

She also served as vice-president of the World Peace Council until her death.

She died aged 85 in Sèvres, near Paris.

== Honours and tributes ==
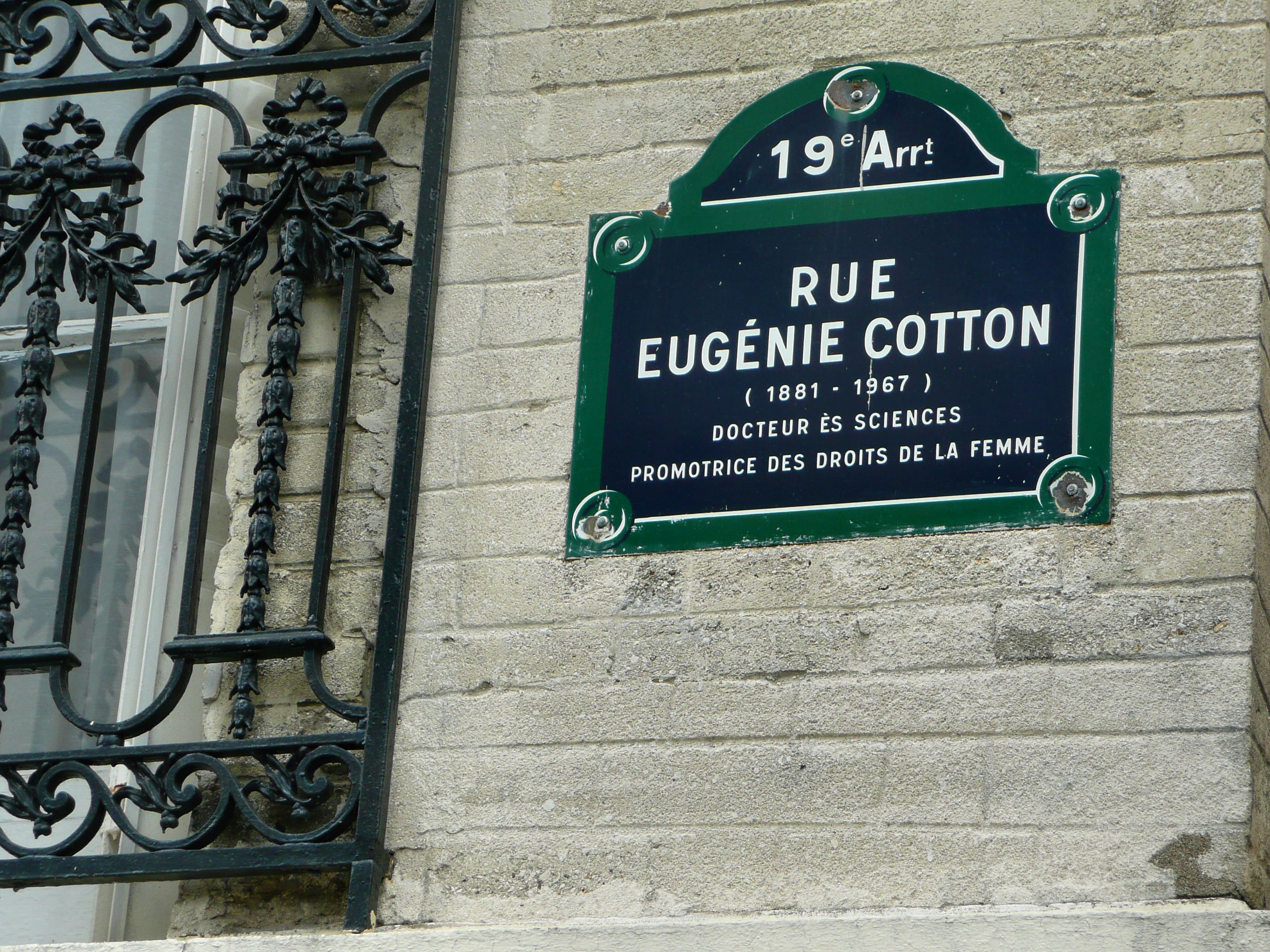
Rue de Eugénie Cotton in 19th arrondissement of Paris

During her lifetime, Cotton was honoured as a Knight of the Legion of Honor in 1934, received the Stalin Peace Prize "for the strengthening of peace between nations" in 1951,and was awarded the Gold medal by the World Peace Council in 1961.

After her death, several primary schools in the Paris region were renamed after Cotton: in Paris, Sèvres, Champigny-sur-Marne, Nanterre, Vitry-sur-Seine, Bonneuil-sur-Marne, or Rosny-sous-bois. There is also a Eugénie Cotton nursery school in Brétigny-sur-Orge, in Choisy-le-Roi, in Trappes and a school in Brittany, in Lanester, as well as in the Aube in Romilly-sur-Seine and in Moselle at Talange.

Cotton's name was also given to a college of Argenteuil and in Montreuil, a street in the 19th arrondissement of Paris, a street in Saint-Herblain on the outskirts of Nantes, a street in Le Havre, as well as a collective crèche in Morsang-sur-Orge in the department of Essonne.

In 1985, the crater Cotton on Venus was named in her honour.

In 2026, Cotton was announced as one of 72 historical women in STEM whose names have been proposed to be added to the 72 men already celebrated on the Eiffel Tower. The plan was announced by the Mayor of Paris, Anne Hidalgo following the recommendations of a committee led by Isabelle Vauglin of Femmes et Sciences and Jean-François Martins, representing the operating company which runs the Eiffel Tower.

== Archives ==
Eugénie Cotton's archives are preserved in the collection of feminist literature held at the library La bibliothèque Marguerite Durand, 79 rue Nationale, in the 13th arrondissement of Paris. The collection includes professional and private correspondence, including letters from Madeleine Dreux-Zay, Suzanne Lacorre, Marie-Claude Vaillant-Couturier and Pierre Seghers, alongside documents dealing with the ENS and press cuttings.

== Books ==
- Cotton, E. (1963). Cotton, A. A. (ed.). Les Curie et la radioactivité [The Curies] (in French) (Éditions Seghers ed.). Paris: Éditions Seghers – Volume 14 of Savants du monde entier (published 1971). ISSN 0558-7352.
- Cotton, Eugénie (1967). Aimé Cotton (in French). Éditions Seghers.

== See also ==
- List of women associated with Marie Curie and Irène Joliot-Curie
